= List of New Zealand suffragists =

This is a List of New Zealand suffragists who were born in New Zealand or whose lives and works are closely associated with that country.

== A ==
- Georgina Shorland Abernethy (1859–1906), president of the Gore Women's Franchise League
- Stella May Henderson Allan (1871-1962), of Christchurch, signed the 1893 petition as a university graduate and later became a journalist
- Lily May Kirk Atkinson (1866–1921) of Wellington, president of Women's Christian Temperance Union of New Zealand (WCTU NZ) 1901–1905
- Ruth Atkinson (1861–1927), suffragist and temperance activist in Nelson

== B ==
- Ann Parkes Brame (1836–1906) of Auckland, charter president in February 1885 of the Auckland chapter of the Women's Christian Temperance Union of New Zealand (WCTU NZ).
- Eliza Annie Palmer Brown (1847–1923) of Invercargill, charter president in 1884 of New Zealand's first Woman's Christian Temperance Union club - it was not officially connected to any other organisation at that time.
- Margaret Carson Bullock, also known as Tua-o-rangi, (1845–1903), co-founder of the Wanganui Women's Franchise League and later the Women's Political League; she also served as vice-president of the WCTU NZ in 1900.

== C ==
- Dolce Ann Cabot Duncan (1862–1943) of Christchurch, the first woman to join the staff of a New Zealand newspaper, advocating women's suffrage in her articles in The Canterbury Times
- Elizabeth Russell Caradus (1832–1912) of Auckland, founding member of the Auckland branch of the Young Women's Christian Association (YWCA) and member of the Auckland branch of the Women's Christian Temperance Union of New Zealand (WCTU NZ)
- Harriet Sophia Day Cobb (1855–1929) of Napier, businesswoman (photography) who signed the 1893 petition
- Mary Ann Barnes Colclough a.k.a. "Polly Plum" (1836–1885) of Auckland, teacher, writer and orator
- Fanny Buttery Cole (1860–1913) of Christchurch, president of WCTU NZ 1906–1913, anti-war activist

== D ==
- Amey Hamerton Daldy (1829–1920) of Auckland, member of Auckland Women's Christian Temperance Union of New Zealand (WCTU NZ) and then president of local Women's Franchise League, philanthropist
- Learmonth White Dalrymple (c.1827–1906) of Levin and Dunedin, active in the women's suffrage movement while living in Feilding where she signed the 1893 suffrage petition; organizing president of the Levin WCTU NZ; served as WCTU NZ Superintendent of the Bible in Schools as well as WCTU NZ Superintendent of Peace and Arbitration
- Rachel Hull Don (1866–1941) of Dunedin, president of WCTU NZ 1914–1926

== E ==
- Kate Milligan Edger Evans (1857–1935) of Wellington, member of local chapter of the Women's Christian Temperance Union New Zealand (WCTU NZ) and held many national offices, including White Ribbon associate editor for 11 years

== F ==
- Jane Foley (aka Hēni Te Kiri Karamū and also as Hēni Pore) of Rotorua, organiser for Women's Christian Temperance Union of New Zealand (WCTU NZ) and honorary secretary for the Māori district of Rotorua
- Priscilla Andrews Froggatt of Invercargill, founding treasurer of 1884 WCTU branch before Mary Leavitt arrived in 1885; signed the 1893 suffrage petition
- Catherine Henrietta Elliot Valpy Fulton of Dunedin, founding member of local chapter of WCTU NZ in 1885, national president of WCTU NZ 1889–1892

== G ==
- Edith Howitt Searle Grossmann (1863–1931) of Christchurch, in 1892 she co-founded the Canterbury Women's Institute which worked to organise suffrage advocacy work (similar to Women's Franchise Leagues)

== H ==
- Matehaere Arapata Tiria "Ripeka" Brown Halbert of Manutuke, elected Vice President of Māori District Union of WCTU NZ in 1911 at convention held in Pakipaki
- Marion Hanover Hatton (1835–1905) of Dunedin, president of the Dunedin Franchise League in 1892-93.
- Alice Henderson (1860-1952) of Christchurch, signed the 1893 suffrage petition along with her sisters.
- Christina Kirk Henderson (1861–1953) of Christchurch, member (and later president) of the Christchurch WCTU and worked for women's suffrage with the Canterbury Liberal Association

== K ==
- Hēni Te Kiri Karamū (aka Jane Foley or Hēni Pore) of Rotorua, see Jane Foley above
- Cybele Ethel Kirk (1870–1957) of Wellington, president of the local chapter of Women's Christian Temperance Union of New Zealand (WCTU NZ), president of National Council of Women of New Zealand 1934–1937, president of WCTU NZ 1946–1949
- Sarah Jane Mattocks Kirk (1829–1916) of Wellington, president of the local chapter of WCTU NZ

== L ==
- Catherine "Kate" Wilson Malcolm Sheppard Lovell-Smith (1848–1934) of Christchurch, New Zealand - see also Kate Sheppard below
- Lucy M. Lovell-Smith (1861-1936) of Christchurch, editor and business manager of WCTU NZ's White Ribbon

== M ==
- Jessie Mackay (1864–1938) of Christchurch, poet and activist for women's suffrage in the Canterbury region, then working as a journalist and with the National Council of Women of New Zealand to further the cause of women's rights.
- Meri Mangakāhia (1868–1920) of Panguru, campaigner for Māori women's suffrage in the Kotahitanga Parliament, writer
- Isabella May (1850-1926) of Christchurch, leader in Women's Christian Temperance Union New Zealand and co-founder of the Canterbury Women's Institute, advocate for dress reform, wholefoods reform and cycling
- Harriet Russell Morison (1862–1925) of Dunedin trade unionist, co-founded the Dunedin Women's Franchise League
- Mary Ann Wilson Griffiths Müller (1819/1820?–1901) a.k.a. "Fémmina" of Nelson, pamphleteer, writer
- Sarah "Hera" Mary Catherine Stirling Munro aka Hera Manaro of Rotorua, national organiser for Māori women in WCTU NZ, founder of several local clubs and founding president of Māori District Union elected at WCTU NZ convention in 1911 at Pakipaki

== N ==
- Helen Lyster Nicol (1854–1902) of Dunedin co-founded the Dunedin Women's Franchise League
- Robina Sinclair Nicol (1861–1942) of Wellington, friend of the Kirk family suffragists who feature in many of her photographs

== P ==
- Emma E. de Winton Packe (1840–1914) of Christchurch, second president of Women's Christian Temperance Union of New Zealand (WCTU NZ) 1887–1889
- Frances Mary "Fanny" Parker OBE (1875–1924) of Kurow, active as a suffragette in Scotland and imprisoned in England
- Mary Sadler Powell (1854–1946) of Invercargill, president of local WCTU NZ branch, life member of World WCTU

== R ==
- Lizzie Frost Fenton Rattray (1855–1931) of Auckland, journalist, member of Auckland Women's Franchise League
- Rachel Selina Pinkerton Reynolds (1838–1928) of Dunedin, vice-president of Dunedin Women's Franchise League

== S ==
- Annie Jane Allen Schnackenberg (1835–1905) of Auckland, founding education superintendent of Auckland chapter of Women's Christian Temperance Union of New Zealand (WCTU NZ) 1885; President Auckland WCTU NZ 1889–1897; National President WCTU NZ 1892–1900
- Catherine "Kate" Wilson Malcolm Sheppard Lovell-Smith (1848–1934) of Christchurch, national Franchise Superintendent for the WCTU NZ, founding editor of the WCTU NZ White Ribbon, founding president of National Council of Women of New Zealand (NCWNZ); featured on the New Zealand ten-dollar note
- Margaret Home Richardson Sievwright (1844–1905) of Gisborne, president of local WCTU NZ chapter, NCWNZ President 1901–1904
- Eleanor Phoebe McLeod Smith (1828-1913) of Christchurch, founding member of Christchurch WCTU, Canterbury Women's Institute, and National Council of Women of New Zealand, signed the 1893 petition along with her two daughters, Eleanor S. Smith and Lucy Masey Smith who lived with her.
- Sarah "Hera" Mary Catherine Stirling Munro of Rotorua, national organiser for Māori women in WCTU NZ, founder of several local clubs and programme coordinator for first Māori WCTU NZ convention in 1911 at Pakipaki
- Anna Paterson Logan Stout (1858–1931) of Dunedin, founding member of Dunedin WCTU NZ 1885, 1892 President of the Dunedin Women's Franchise League; 1896 Vice President for the NCWNZ

== T ==
- Elizabeth Best Ellison Taylor, OBE., JP. of Christchurch, member of local Women's Christian Temperance Union of New Zealand (WCTU NZ), founding member of the National Council of Women of New Zealand, president of Christchurch WCTU NZ 1918 then national president 1926–1935, peace activist
- Ākenehi Tōmoana (1843–1908), Māori woman leader of chiefly status (wāhine rangatira), landowner, suffragist and women's rights activist

== W ==
- Anne Titboald Ward (1825–1896) of Christchurch, New Zealand, provisional president in 1885 then elected founding president of Women's Christian Temperance Union of New Zealand (WCTU NZ) in February 1886
- Ada Pike Wells (1863–1933) of Christchurch, New Zealand, member of Christchurch WCTU NZ, founder of the Canterbury Women's Institute, charter secretary of the NCWNZ
- Eliza White (1809-1883) of Auckland, Wesleyan missionary and founder of Ladies Christian Association in Auckland, credited for recruiting Annie Jane Schnackenberg (later WCTU NZ president) to her mission work in Kawhia in 1861.
- Jessie Marguerite McAllan Williamson (c.1855–1937) of Auckland, was a leader in the Wanganui Women's Franchise League (later renamed the Wanganui Women's Political League) and later the National Council of Women of New Zealand (NCW NZ); when she moved to Remuera she helped form the Auckland Civic League and which she represented when an Auckland branch of the revived NCW NZ

== Y ==
- Elizabeth Oman Yates (1845–1918) of Onehunga, first female mayor in British Empire

== See also ==
- List of suffragists and suffragettes
- National Council of Women of New Zealand
- Women's Christian Temperance Union New Zealand
