= Feminism in New Zealand =

Feminism in New Zealand is a series of actions and a philosophy to advance rights for women in New Zealand. This can be seen to have taken place through parliament and legislation, and also by actions and role modelling by significant women and groups of people throughout New Zealand's history. The women's suffrage movement in New Zealand succeeded in 1893 when New Zealand became the first nation where all women were granted the right to vote. New Zealand was also the first country in the world in which the five highest offices of power were held by women, which occurred between March 2005 and August 2006, with Queen Elizabeth II, Governor-General Silvia Cartwright, Prime Minister Helen Clark, Speaker of the New Zealand House of Representatives Margaret Wilson and Chief Justice Sian Elias. From October 2022 to October 2023, New Zealand achieved gender-equal representation in Parliament for the first time.

In 1840 Māori women were part of the signing of the Treaty of Waitangi that created New Zealand as part of the British Empire under Queen Victoria. Wāhine Māori were at the forefront of the women's suffragist movement, including campaigning for their right to vote and to stand as members of Te Kotahitanga.11 years after universal male suffrage was granted, universal female suffrage was achieved on 19 September 1893. Iriaka Rātana became the first wāhine Māori MP in 1949.

== History ==
=== Pre-colonisation ===
Prior to European settlement of New Zealand Māori women had varied responsibilities as tribal leaders, military strategists, warriors, poets, composers and healers. Their roles were irrespective of their gender. Kinship systems in Māori tribes were often arranged matrilineally.

Diplomacy and rituals of exchange between Māori tribes were often arranged according to the concept of mana wahine, the prestige and political power held by a woman or the women of a tribe. Today, numerous Māori iwi and hapū descended from such women insist on identifying themselves as being "the people of" that particular female ancestor. For example, on the East Coast of the North Island a prominent iwi group is Ngāti Kahungunu, eponymous of the male ancestor Kahungunu. However within the Mahia area of that region, there is a local preference for the name Ngāti Rongomaiwahine; Rongomaiwahine being known as the more prestigious ancestor of the people there. Similar insistence is made by members of Ngāti Hinemoa and Ngāti Hinemanu.

Scholars have suggested that the solidification of a patriarchal structure in Māori societies was shaped by colonial contact, largely through the expectations and prejudices of European settler-traders and Christian missionaries.

=== Timeline ===
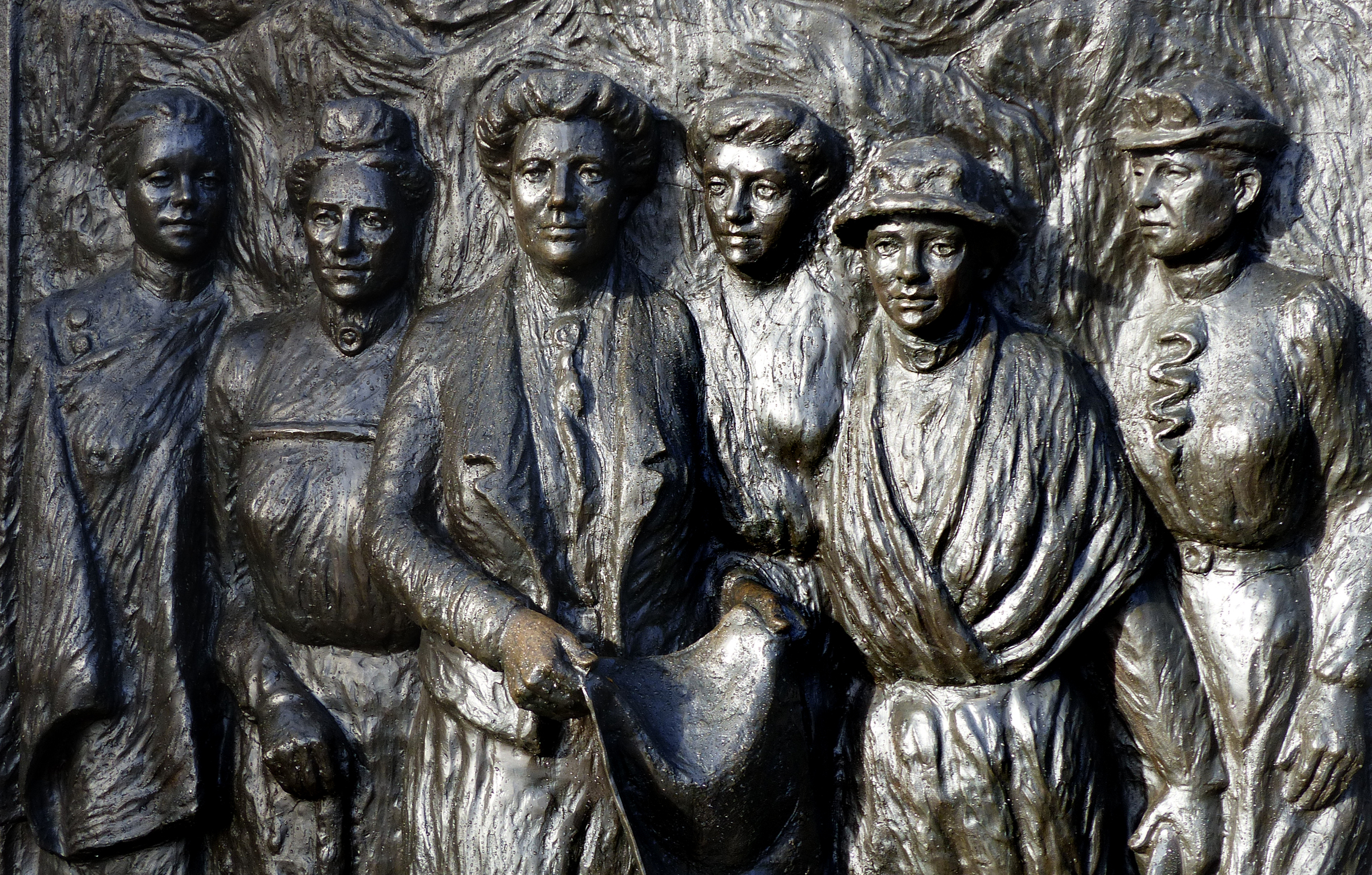
Close up of the Kate Sheppard Memorial in Christchurch by artist Margriet Windhausen. Featuring leaders of the suffrage movement in New Zealand. From L to R: Meri Te Tai Mangakāhia, Amey Daldy, Kate Sheppard, Ada Wells, Harriet Morison, and Helen Nicol.

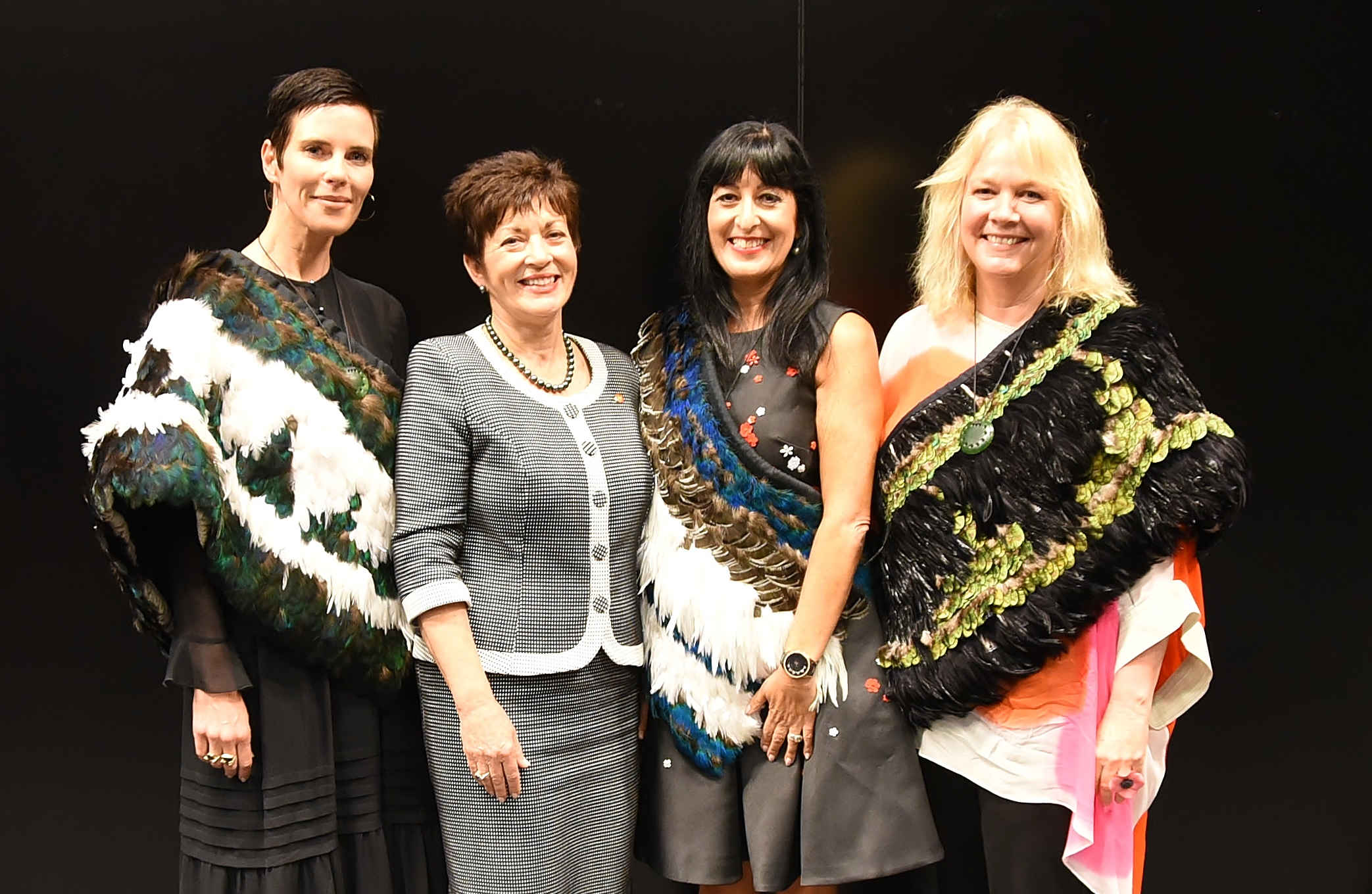
Dame Patsy Reddy (second from left) with the 2017 inductees into the New Zealand Hall of Fame for Women Entrepreneurs - fashion designer Karen Walker (left), fund founder Carmel Fisher (second from right) and financier-philanthropist Audette Exel

- 1860: Married women's Property Perfection Act, allows women to keep their earning and belongings if deserted.
- 1864: Heni Pore, fought for the King movement and distinguished herself at Gate Pa. Later, became the Secretary to the Māori Women's Christian Temperance Union, and later became known as an expert on Māori land title.
- 1867: The Municipal Corporations Act and The Divorce and Matrimonial Causes Act was created and enforced.
- 1873: Employment of Females Act enforced.
- 1884: Married Women's Property Act.
- 1893: Pākehā and Māori women won the right to vote in general elections due to the Electoral Act, and Elizabeth Yates became New Zealand's first female mayor in the British Empire.
- 1895: The first women's hockey team was established, and Minnie Dean, was the only New Zealand woman to hang.
- 1896: National Council of Women of New Zealand was created, Emily Siedeberg became the first female doctor to graduate, and Mary Ann Bacon became the country's first female stockbroker.
- 1897 Ethel Benjamin became the first woman to be admitted as a barrister and solicitor.
- 1898: The Divorce Act of 1898 allowed for the dissolution of marriage equally for women and men.
- 1933: Elizabeth McCombs becomes the first woman elected to Parliament.
- 1938: Catherine Stewart becomes the first woman elected to Parliament not via Widow's succession.
- 1946: Two women appointed to the Legislative Council; Mary Anderson and Mary Dreaver.
- 1947: Mabel Howard, who was elected to Parliament in 1943 becomes New Zealand's first female Cabinet Minister.
- 1949: Iriaka Rātana becomes the first Māori woman elected to Parliament.
- 1951: Māori Women's Welfare League founded with Dame Whina Cooper as president.
- 1966: Princess Piki Paki of Huntly, 35, was chosen to become the first Māori Queen; Te Arikinui Dame Te Atairangikaahu was the sixth Māori monarch of the Kingitanga.
- 1975: Marilyn Waring at age 23, becomes the youngest member of the New Zealand Parliament.
- 1976: Mary Ronnie of Dunedin became the first woman in the world to head a national library.
- 1983: Catherine Tizard becomes the first female Mayor of Auckland City.
- 1984: Ann Hercus appointed first Minister for Women's Affairs.
- 1988: Lowell Goddard and Sian Elias become the first women appointed as Queen's Counsel of New Zealand.
- 1989: Catherine Tizard becomes the first female Governor-General of New Zealand.
- 1993: Jane Campion was the first female filmmaker to receive a Palme d'Or award at the Cannes Film Festival (for The Piano).
- 1995: Georgina Beyer of Wairarapa was the world's first transgender woman elected Mayor, and then Member of Parliament in 1999.
- 1997: Jenny Shipley becomes first female Prime Minister of New Zealand.
- 1999: Helen Clark becomes first elected female Prime Minister of New Zealand.
- 1999: Sian Elias becomes the first female Chief Justice of New Zealand.
- 2005: Margaret Wilson becomes the first female Speaker of the New Zealand House of Representatives. As a result, all five of the most senior positions of state are simultaneously held by women, as Wilson served with Queen Elizabeth II as Queen of New Zealand, Silvia Cartwright as Governor-General of New Zealand, Sian Elias as Chief Justice of New Zealand, and Helen Clark as Prime Minister of New Zealand.
- 2009: Helen Clark was the first woman to serve as Administrator of the United Nations Development Programme (2009-2017).
- 2016: Historian Barbara Brookes published her groundbreaking History of New Zealand Women.
- 2017: Kristine Bartlett was appointed a Companion of the New Zealand Order of Merit, for services to equal pay advocacy. The National Council of Women of NZ | Te Kaunihera Wāhine o Aotearoa, began Gender Attitudes Surveys with Rangahau Aotearoa Research NZ every two years. Labour’s Jacinda Ardern became New Zealand’s third female Prime Minister of New Zealand.
- 2020: Jacinda Ardern wins landslide victory for Labour in parliamentary elections.
- 2022: Soraya Peke-Mason became New Zealand’s 177th female MP and gave women 61 seats in the House of Representatives.

=== Population gender shift ===
Once European migrants started arrived in New Zealand through colonisation there were more men than women. By 1916 and 1941 the gender differences were about equal. By 1971 the gender shift began and women began to outnumber the men. By 2001 there were 104 women to every 100 men. The female population is expected to outrank the male population by 2051, because of the high mortality rate among men aged 15–24, and the female life expectancy is expected to increase much faster than males.

== Situation for women ==
In 2001 there were 63,000 more women than men. According to census records in 2001, this trend was expected to continue with other situations in the lives of New Zealand women included:

- a decline in the birth and fertility rates in younger women, and childbearing in later years
- a change in family structure, with changes in marriage rates and blended parenting such as such as stepfamilies
- women's incomes below men
- more women (90%) in secretarial, nursing, and midwife positions while carpenters, joiners, mechanics, fitters, and heavy truck drivers were mostly men.
- younger women are more qualified educationally than older women.

In the study in 2001 by academic Ann Magee she identified the following positive changes and initiatives that affected women:

- an increase in the number of women in self-employment
- an increase in organisations/networks such as WISE, Women into Self-Employment; National Council of Women; Society for Research on Women; the Women's Electoral Lobby; Sisters Overseas Service
- the development of gender analysis methodology
- an increase in "out of school" care offered to low income communities
- an increase in government cooperation to overcome gender bias in employment towards the Maori, Pacific Island, rural and urban women.
- more attention to child care provision and paid parent leave, thus allowing more women to participate in employment
- a renewed look on retirement income, especially those of Maori women.
- an increase in participation of women in local governmental affairs, including taking office such as mayors.
- improvements on the anti-domestic violence legislation (1995)
- a national breast screening programme
- free visits to medical practitioners for children under 6 years old

In 2000 the Property (Relationships) Bill was introduced which allows women to have access to property and earnings following a marriage or de facto relationship break down. This law also applies to same sex couples, given they have lived together for three years.

== Mana wāhine ==
=== Mana wāhine / Māori feminist discourses ===
Arguably, Māori women have been involved with New Zealand feminism since 1840, when at least three Māori women were included in the signing of the Treaty of Waitangi which created New Zealand. This was significant at a time when women generally did not hold power within the British Empire. It is reported that these women were allowed to sign the treaty after the Māori women had expressed their anger at being excluded. The New Zealand suffrage movement included Māori women who also lobbied to be allowed to vote. In particular, there were Māori women who were landowners and they argued that they should not be barred from political representation. A minority (1.73%) of Māori men first voted in 1852 and all Māori men achieved universal suffrage in 1867; women (both Māori and Pākehā) gained universal suffrage in 1893.

A major focus of the early women's movements was the development of bicultural relations between Māori and Pākehā. Political advances were made when Iriaka Rātana was the first Māori woman MP, who was elected in 1949.

The development of the Māori Women's Welfare League or Te Rōpū Wāhine Māori Toko I te Ora in 1951 in Wellington, provided an avenue for Māori women to be represented in the New Zealand government. While the original goal of the League was to preserve Māori culture and to promote fellowship and cooperation between various women's organisations, it became heavily involved in housing, health and education issues and was instrumental in making te reo Māori part of the country's official languages.

In 1970, women's liberation groups were formed in New Zealand and included Māori women in decision-making. However, within a few years, Māori women began to separate from these groups to focus on their own issues. Many of the feminist organisations dominated by white, middle-class women were delivering health and legal services but these were not reaching many Māori women whose main concerns were economic.

=== Background ===
To understand the key issues for Māori feminists, it is necessary to understand mana wāhine. In te reo Māori, the Māori language, what may be termed “feminist discourses” are often referred to as ‘mana wāhine’. Mana wāhine discourses allows for the extension of Kaupapa Māori, Māori practice and principles, to the intersection of Māori and female identities, and makes said intersection visible. Kaupapa Māori locates itself within a worldview different to that stereotypical of the west, allowing for the generation of new solutions. As a result, mana wāhine is, in contrast to the broader projects of ‘feminism’, a self-deterministic approach that gives effect to the intersections of female and Māori identities. Visibility and validation of this intersection in-turn validates mātauranga wāhine, Māori women's knowledge. For some, preference for the term ‘mana wāhine’, in contrast to ‘feminist’, is a direct result of the preconceptions attached to said title of ‘feminist’, particularly in Pākehā culture.

Multiple theories of Māori feminism (mana wāhine) exist concurrently due to the diversity of iwi, ‘tribes’, across Aotearoa/New Zealand. Māori, regardless of iwi, share great disruptions that occurred as a direct result of the processes of colonisation. There are, therefore, great differences between the Māori and Pākehā feminist projects. In order to encompass a wide-view of issues facing women of Māori heritage, many argue that te reo Māori me ona tikanga (Maori Language and Culture) are necessary inclusions in mana wāhine, and this epitomises the differences between mana wāhine and Pākehā feminism. Biculturalism, therefore, is often campaigned for by Māori feminism, allowing for a simultaneous campaign for Indigenous rights; a campaign bypassed completely by multiculturalism. Mana wāhine, therefore, acts as a tool which allows Māori women to take control over their history and future. That is, mana wāhine, by necessity, takes into account sexism, racism, colonialism and class and overlaps with the political aspirations for self-determination. This is why mana wāhine is an important area of discourse.

Mana wāhine allows for the provision of analysis unique to the position held by those lying in the intersections of Māori and women. The unique world-view of the Māori population is vital in the understanding of pre-colonial Māori society. Sources such as Māori society, both te ao hou and te ao tawhito (the present and past); te reo Māori; Māori women's histories; and nga tikanga Māori, Māori customary practices, are important in development of these discourses. Indeed, these sources give great importance to Māori sovereignty. Kaupapa Māori conjointly working with mana wāhine locates Māori women in intersections of oppression from colonisation and the racism resulting therefrom, in addition to sexism. The effect of colonisation was devastating, the estrangement of whānau, community, and the enforcement of the ‘nuclear’ family were particularly harmful. colonisation also resulted in the enforcement of traditional, western, religious ideas of the status of women and this resulted in a dramatic shift of power away from women in Māori culture.

=== Current issues ===
Biculturalism continues to be a key emphasis for mana wāhine as it informs wider debates about colonisation and decolonialism, ethnicities and politics. Biculturalism emphasises the important position of Māori culture, whereas in a multicultural nation Māori would be just one culture among many. This could then remove their sovereignty and the relationship Māori have with their land.

Colonisation significantly disrupted all of Māori society, but the disruption was on multiple levels for women. As a result, Māori women have needed to reassert their positions and status, not just in the broad society but also in their own communities. They have needed to find their own voices. However, this discussion does not always resonate with Pākehā women as they believe that Western feminism is for everyone. Māori women emphasise the need to be visible in their differences as those differences count. Of importance is the need to highlight that unless the ‘multiple forces of subjugation’ resulting from colonisation are taken into account, feminism cannot fully account for the realities of Māori women.

Historically, as Māori collectivism gave way to Christian individualism, Māori have increasingly been forced into the Pākehā model of the nuclear family. This has meant that Māori women have become increasingly vulnerable as their dependence on their husbands has increased and as they have become increasingly isolated from their broader community. In addition, Māori women often end up with the jobs that Pākehā women do not want. It can therefore seem that Māori women end up with the ‘scraps’ from Pākehā women.

There are critical differences between Māori women and men in relation to health, education, employment, and family structure and support. Critically, lifestyle options and opportunities for Māori women have been restricted. However, even when it is identified that there are specific issues impacting Māori women, they are often not included in the forums for resolution. And if they are, their voices may be shut down.

One of the goals of mana wāhine is to ensure that Māori women can make sense of their different realities and identities, and to celebrate the strength and resilience of Māori women. As a result, mana wāhine stories and theories have been diverse rather than homogenous. This includes differing views on how to best achieve equity and reminding others, including Māori men, about who they are and where they have come from. Many Māori today have been disconnected from their traditional cultures which have been reinterpreted through post-colonial eyes, resulting in some Māori men using this to deny women power and a voice. When this is combined with Pākehā feminist priorities, many Māori women feel they are ignored when both gender and colonisation issues and impacts are discussed i.e. they are seen as lesser. However, it is important that Māori women are not viewed as passive victims waiting to be rescued by Pākehā women.

Some Māori academics have asserted that the term 'lesbian' is one with a western history and with western connotations, a term that may contradict some Māori cultural histories. Sexuality, however, remains an important area of intersectional discourse for mana wāhine and Māori feminist projects, with many prominent figures working in this field, including activist Ngahuia Te Awekotuku.

=== Visual art and performance ===
The art of Māori women often confronts issues that have been underscored as relating to mana wāhine. The materials used in the preparation and production of artworks are not simply a means to an end; they are integral to the work and possess important meaning. The forms which artworks and objects take are diverse, ranging from sound and performance to painting, jewellery, and fashion; these forms are not simply the vehicle or vessel of artistic expression - they embody inherently the message of the work. Artists’ use of the body and space interrogates various issues, discourses and sites of contention including (but not confined to): the gendered cultural practices of Pākehā colonisation; the tensions between urban life and traditional spirituality; the restoration of cultural memory – cultural narratives (oral histories); and modern situational cultural and geographic isolation caused by dispossession.

Feminist art has been criticized for being irrelevant to Māori women. The continuous, ageless dynamism of mana wāhine is rather a more applicable term for this discussion. Additionally, because mana wāhine envelops these works within its matrices, they speak with a richer prescience than a work that is simply an expression of art in and of itself and necessarily gives way to a more expansive function and understanding of art, as such.

Catriona Moore, speaking of feminist art more broadly, notes the multiplicities of purposes, directions, and outcomes that are characteristics of feminist art and aesthetics – these make the artworld a dynamic space for discussion, development and advancement. Art characterised or described within a mana wāhine context operates similarly. However, artists who identify with and engage in exploring mana wāhine through their artistic practices do not necessarily identify as feminists, or label their art as such.

Diverse works such as those by the Mataaho Collective and the performance art of Rosanna Raymond, announce and attempt to realise reconnection and reclamation, two tenants that situate women in mana wāhine and characterise activism in this space. Dr Maureen Lander's fibre and installation art and Shona Rapira Davies’ use of textile and object making practices delineate the strength of Māori women and the subtle processes of restoration and affirmation achieved through their commitment to investing in and working with traditional materials.

Similarly the artistic practices of Nova Paul, Lisa Reihana, and interdisciplinary artist and archivist Tuāfale Tanoa'i aka Linda T, expend notions of conventional image making and cinematic art. These artists and their works are reminiscent of and carry on the practice of Merita Mata, which continue to challenge colonial narratives imbued with rejections of systemic Pākehā patriarchal models of power, knowledge and ownership.

The central place of exploring Māori mythologies through themes such as mourning, life, death, sovereignty, place and the spaces women occupy are interrogated in works by artists such as Alisa L. Smith and Robyn Kahukiwa. Importantly, Robyn Kahukiwa does not associate herself with feminism. However, Kahukiwa's works find expression in mana wāhine, specifically with reference to the important place of women in Māori spirituality. By extension, the synergies in the expansive works of Pasifika Queen and Sissy that Walk, who critique modern understandings of gender and sexuality, further create discourses around Māori identity and representation.

== See also ==
- Gender equality in New Zealand
- Goddess movement
- Women's suffrage in New Zealand
- Women's liberation movement in Oceania#New Zealand
- Women in New Zealand
- Anno Domini 2000, or, Woman's Destiny, an 1889 novel written by a former Prime Minister who foresaw a time when women would have the vote and hold positions of authority
- Category:New Zealand suffragists
- Category:New Zealand feminists
- Timeline of the Feminist art movement in New Zealand
