= Sarah Jackson =

Sara or Sarah Jackson may refer to:

- Sarah Catherwood (born 1980), also known as Sarah Jackson, New Zealand Olympic swimmer
- Sarah Jackson (artist) (1924–2004), Canadian artist
- Sarah Jackson (soccer) (born 1991), American soccer player who played for Arna-Bjørnar
- Sarah Jackson (teacher) (1858–1946), New Zealand teacher, industrial school matron and manager, community leader
- Sarah Yorke Jackson (1803–1887), daughter-in-law of U.S. President Andrew Jackson
- Sara Dunlap Jackson (1919–1991), American archivist
- Sara Jackson-Holman, American singer-songwriter
