= Mavis Tiller =

New Zealand's women advocate (1901–1989)

Mavis Tiller CBE

President of the National Council of Women
- In office 1966–1970

Personal details
- Born: Mavis Ada Gell; 25 November 1901 Wellington, New Zealand
- Died: 25 July 1989 (aged 87) London, England
- Spouse: Leslie Walter Tiller (m. 1937; died 1981)
- Children: 3
- Occupation: Women's advocate; scientist

Mavis Ada Tiller CBE (née Gell; 25 November 1901 – 25 July 1989) was a New Zealand women's advocate and scientist. She served as president of the National Council of Women of New Zealand (NCWNZ) from 1966 to 1970.

== Early life and career ==
Tiller was born in Wellington. Her father worked for the New Zealand Post and Telegraph Department for some years, but when she was young, the family moved to London.

Tiller attended Bedford College, London, and earned a Bachelor of Science degree (second class honours) in chemistry from the University of London in 1923. After graduating she first worked as science mistress at the Roedean School, Johannesburg, and subsequently worked in the metallurgy department at the National Physical Laboratory in Teddington. In 1937 she married Leslie Tiller, a fellow New Zealander and scientist, at St Alban's Church. They returned to live in Wellington where they had a daughter, born in 1938, and two sons born in 1941 and 1944.

== Activism ==
From the early 1950s, Tiller was involved with many organisations including the Wellington Mothers' Helpers Association, the Women's Migration and Overseas Appointments Society, the NCWNZ, the International Council of Women (ICW), and the United Nations Association of Wellington. From 1961 to 1966 she was the president of the Wellington branch of the NCWNZ, and in 1966 she represented New Zealand at the ICW conference in Tehran. For nearly twenty years she was the president of the Wellington Mothers' Helpers Association and was awarded a life membership for her work.

From 1966 to 1970 she served as the national president of the NCWNZ. She was instrumental in modernising the organisation and in establishing the Parliamentary Watch Committee, which became an effective advocate for women by making submissions on bills and discussion papers. In 1970 she led New Zealand's delegation to the ICW conference in Bangkok. In the 1971 Birthday Honours she was appointed an Officer of the Order of the British Empire for this role. From 1973 to 1982 she served as the vice-convenor, then convenor, of the ICW's Standing Committee on International Relations and Peace. In 1976 she was made a life member of the NCWNZ, the highest award bestowed by the organisation. Also in that year, she received the Adelaide Ristori Prize from the Italian Cultural Centre, a feminist organisation, for outstanding service.

Tiller was appointed to the Royal Commission on Social Security in 1969, which reported in 1972. She was the only woman on the commission and the first woman to sit on a Royal Commission in New Zealand for 30 years. Historian Dorothy Page has said that it was only as a result of Tiller asking the National Development Council at a conference session, "Where are the women?", that Miriam Dell was subsequently appointed as the first woman on the Council in 1969.

In the 1987 New Year Honours Tiller was appointed a Commander of the Order of the British Empire for services to the community.

Tiller died in London, England, on 25 July 1989, at the age of 87. She had been predeceased by her husband, Leslie Tiller, in 1981.
