= Gender inequality in New Zealand =

Overview of gender equality in New Zealand

Gender equality is the state of equal ease of access to resources and opportunities regardless of gender, including economic participation and decision-making, and the state of valuing different behaviours, aspirations, and needs equally, also regardless of gender. Gender equality is a human right, which is recognised under the United Nations Universal Declaration of Human Rights.

Gender equality is increasingly framed as being central to the realisation of both modernisation and economic efficiency, and its achievement presented as a key to good governance. In 2025, New Zealand was ranked 5th out of a total of 148 countries in the Global Gender Gap Report which ranks countries in terms of gender equality in the population under four dimensions: economic participation and opportunity, educational attainment, health and survival, and political empowerment.

== Overview ==
According to the New Zealand Government's Progress Report on the Beijing Platform for Action, published May 2024, the biggest challenges for achieving gender equality on a national level are increased rates in women's underutilisation, underemployment, and unemployment, the gender pay gap, high levels of family and sexual violence, and addressing gender inequity in health.

In the World Economic Forum's 2025 annual report on the Global Gender Gap, New Zealand ranks at 5th place – the only country in the region of Eastern Asia & The Pacific to rank in the Top 10. The report analyses the gender gap through four dimensions: economic participation and opportunity, educational attainment, health and survival, and political empowerment. The overall gender parity score for New Zealand in 2025 sits at 82.7%, slightly below the peak of 85.6% achieved in 2023. The decline is partially due to the drop in political empowerment, with Parity in ministerial positions dropping from 81.8 percent in 2023 to 53.8 percent in 2025 and Parliamentary representation dropping after the achievement of full parity in 2023. The Economic Participation and Opportunity subindex is following a downward trend, dropping to 70% parity for the first time since 2007. A limitation of the report is that the score is not affected when men are disadvantaged compared to women. That is, a gender gaps favouring women are not counted as gaps.

The Basic Index of Gender Inequality (BIGI) seeks to address the shortcomings of WEF Global Gender Gap index and other gender inequality measures by selecting the most broadly applicable metrics and including disadvantages faced by men in the score. BIGI has three dimensions, educational opportunities in childhood, healthy life expectancy, and, overall life satisfaction. New Zealand scores -0.01709 and is in fifth place globally when ranked by BIGIs average absolute deviation from parity. A negative score in BIGI indicates that men are disadvantaged compared to women.

== History ==
=== Pre-colonisation and early European settlement ===
In precolonial Māori society, women had a say in the affairs of their iwi or hapū and could inherit land. They had varied responsibilities as tribal leaders, military strategists, warriors, poets, composers and healers. Their roles were irrespective of their gender. Kinship systems in Māori tribes were often arranged matrilineally.

During the 19th century, European settlers assumed that Māori women were not powerful in society. Due to this assumption, they only negotiated with Māori men, and caused inequality between men and women to arise. The settlers brought with them patriarchal ideas, including the expectation that women are wives, mothers and homemakers, while men are supposed to support their wives and children financially.

=== Women's suffrage ===
The first period of intense activism to challenge gender inequality was from the 1880s-1890s. Kate Sheppard, the Women's Christian Temperance Union, and women's franchise leagues, fought for the right for women to be able to vote. This was interlinked with a campaign for moral reform, including the banning of alcohol. Suffragettes submitted bills to parliament 3 years in a row – with the Legislative Council (the Upper House) blocking two bills in 1891 and 1892. In 1893, New Zealand became the first country in the world to give women (Pākehā and Māori) the right to vote in national elections. Other gender equality campaigns at the time focused on women's rights within marriage, and against the double standard that prevailed in relation to sexual behaviour.

=== Gender inequality in parliament ===
Women were not able to stand for parliament until 1919. The first woman to win an election was Elizabeth McCombs in 1933. Iriaka Rātana was the first Māori woman MP, elected in 1949. Dame Jenny Shipley was the first woman to be Prime Minister in New Zealand from 1997 to 1999. Gender equal representation was reached from October 2022 to October 2023, when there were 61 female MPs and 60 male MPs.

=== Second-wave feminism ===
The second period of intense activism challenging gender inequality focused on broad cultural issues, political representation, employment issues, and sexuality and reproductive rights. This led to legal and social changes in New Zealand. The first significant event was the establishment of the Society for Research on Women in 1966. Another significant achievement was the establishment of the Equal Pay Act 1972. The Manatū Wāhine Ministry for Women (under the name Ministry of Women's Affairs) was established in 1984. The Human Rights Commission Act 1977 prohibited discrimination on grounds of sexual orientation, pregnancy, marital status (including living in a de facto relationship) or family status.

The country ratified the Convention on the Elimination of All Forms of Discrimination against Women (CEDAW) on 10 January 1985, and its optional protocol on 7 September 2000. The Ministry for Women is responsible for administrating the CEDAW and its Optional Protocol. The committee on the Elimination of Discrimination against Women makes recommendations on any issues affecting women that the state should address. As of December 2024, the committee has made 40 general recommendations on issues affecting women that states should devote more attention to.

=== Gender inequality in the New Zealand Defence Force ===
Conscription of men into combat roles was enacted during the New Zealand Wars, the First World War, and the Second World War. Following the First World War, men who failed to serve as required lost some civil rights for 10 years.Women were barred from serving in combat roles during these periods and therefore were not conscripted into battle. In the Second World War, both women and men were conscripted into essential jobs in New Zealand to fill the gap of the male workers who were fighting. From 1961 to 1973 there was compulsory military service for men drawn from a ballot. The New Zealand Defence Force became fully integrated in 1977, allowing women to join the Army, Navy, and Air Force alongside men. However, women were unable to serve in combat zones until 2000.

=== Prohibition of homosexuality ===
Historical inequalities for men include the prohibition of homosexuality for men until the homosexual law reform bill in 1986. From 1893 to 1986, male homosexual acts had faced severe legal penalties in New Zealand, evolving from capital punishment to life imprisonment and hard labour. Lesbianism was never criminalised, however lesbians sometimes lost their jobs, or were sent to psychiatric hospitals.

== Legislation for gender equity ==
Section 21 of the Human Rights Act 1993 prohibits discrimination in the workplace on the grounds of sex (including pregnancy and child birth), marital status and family status. The New Zealand Bill of Rights Act 1990 protects all New Zealand citizens from discrimination on the basis of sex.

The legal framework in New Zealand provides comprehensive protection against all forms of discrimination covered by the Convention on the Elimination of All Forms of Discrimination against Women (CEDAW). The International Covenant on Civil and Political Rights and the International Covenant on Economic, Social and Cultural Rights require New Zealand to ensure equal enjoyment of rights between men and women.

Selected laws improving gender equality in New Zealand
Year	Law	Change
1893	Electoral Act	Enabled women to vote.
1919	Women's Parliamentary Rights Act	Enabled women to stand for parliament.
1960	Government Service Equal Pay Act	Introduced equal pay to the public service.
1962	Superannuation Amendment Act	Raised women's retirement age to match men's.
1964	Joint Family Homes Act	Allows a husband and/or wife to settle any land on their spouse as a joint family home.
1972	Shops and Offices Amendment Act	Allowed females to work after 10:30pm.
1972	Equal Pay Act	Requires employers to pay men and women equally for equal work.
1973	Social Security Amendment Act	Established Domestic Purpose Benefit for solo parents and 'women alone'. A solo father only qualified if he had "lost his wife by death, divorce, or some other cause".
1973	Accident Compensation Amendment Act	Extended compensation provisions to non-earners.
1976	Matrimonial Property Act	Provided for a more equitable division of property on the dissolution of a marriage, and allows spouses to sue each other in tort.
1976	Land and Income Tax Amendment Act (No 2)	Repealed special exemptions for widows with dependent children.
1976	Government Superannuation Fund Amendment Act	Removes the requirement that the widower of the superannuitant prove that he was financially dependent upon his wife before being entitled to the surviving spouse benefit.
1976	Domicile Act	Abolishes the common law rule that a wife's domicile is dependent on that of her husband.
1976	Social Security Amendment Act	Removed age benefits that allowed women to receive them at 55 and men at 60, and provides the right to social security at age 60 on the same terms for women and men.
1976	Juries Amendment Act	Gave equal responsibility for jury service to woman and men by removed the ability for women to opt-out of jury service more easily than men.
1977	Social Security Amendment Act	Introduced national superannuation without discrimination.
1977	Human Rights Commission Act	Prohibited discrimination on basis of sex and marital status.
1977	Citizenship Act	Accorded all New Zealand citizens the same rights with respect to the citizenship of spouses and children.
1977	Contraception, Sterilisation, and Abortion Act 1977	Established the legal framework for abortion.
1978	State Services Amendment Act	This gives members of the Public Service resigning for child care purposes preferential re-entry rights to the service up to four years after resignation or five years in the case of a woman entitled to maternity leave.
1979	Social Security Amendment Act	Granted men equal opportunity to become dependent spouses.
1980	Family Proceedings Act	This removes discrimination against men in the assessment of maintenance by providing that spouses have the same liability to maintain each other, and institutes a no-fault divorce.
1980	Guardianship Amendment Act	Explicitly states that neither parent is to be preferred as the custodial parent solely by reason of sex.
1980	Maternity Leave and Employment Protection Act	Guaranteed up to 26 weeks' unpaid leave to most women expecting a baby or adopting a child.
1981	Factories and Commercial Premises Amendment Act	Lifted restrictions on women working during night hours and required employers to provide seating to all employees who work standing up, not just for women.
1982	Social Security Amendment Act	Removed the assumption that widows were totally dependent on their husband, "which discriminated against widowers"
1983	Estate and Gift Duties Amendment Act	"Provided for a gift duty exemption where a matrimonial property agreement results in the non-owner spouse receiving half the matrimonial property."
1985	Crimes Amendment Act	Introduced the gender-neutral 'unlawful sexual connection' which made female perpetrated sexual assaults against men illegal. Removed provision where a husband could not be charged with raping his wife unless they were separated.
1986	Homosexual Law Reform Act 1986	Legalised consensual sexual practices between men.
1987	Parental Leave and Employment Protection Act	Introduced paternity leave.
1987	Social Security Amendment Act	Removed discrimination against solo fathers, allowing them to receive the benefit on equal terms with solo mothers.
1987	Evidence Amendment Act	Removed discrimination against husbands regarding a wife's testimony against him in certain cases.
1995	Crimes Amendment Act	Made female genital mutilation illegal.
2001	Human Rights Amendment Act	Women, as well as men, are now required to assist police officers in certain situations.
2001	War Pensions Amendment Act	Men can now be considered dependants on the same terms as women.
2005	Crimes Amendment Act	Made several gendered sexual crimes gender-neutral, finally protecting boys on the same terms as girls. Also, allowed for male victims of female perpetrated sexual abuse to receive ACC compensation.
2013	Social Security (Benefit Categories and Work Focus) Amendment Act	Removed gendered terms from social security legislation.
2023	Civil Aviation Act	Made the requirements for searching aviation passengers gender neutral.

=== Preventing gender inequality in proposed legislation ===
New Zealand has a mechanism to prevent gender inequality in the proposed legislation. Section 7 of the Bill of Right Act requires the Attorney General to report to Parliament if a bill appears to be inconsistent with the non-discrimination requirements of the act. However, parliament is not bound by these reports.

Papers presented to cabinet are required to undergo a gender analysis by the Ministry for Women to determine the potential impacts on women and girls.

=== Gender neutrality & New Zealand law ===
Proponents of gender neutrality in law, including the New Zealand Law Commission, Law professor Kevin Dawkins from Otago University, and the Human Rights Review Tribunal have recommended several changes to current gendered legislation. The New Zealand Human Rights Commission states "In a free and democratic society (such as New Zealand purports to be) laws should be non-discriminatory on their face, unless the discrimination is demonstrably justified."

The New Zealand Law Commission reviewed the Crimes Act in 2009 and recommended a repeal of the "male assaults female" offence, which has primarily been used to address domestic violence, and increase the maximum penalty for "common assault" to match that of "male assaults female" (3 years). In 2018, the gender neutral charge of "assault on a family member" was introduced, with the same maximum penalty as "male assaults female", therefore becoming inclusive of all relationship gender dynamics.

==== Infanticide ====
In the case of a woman killing her child, she can be charged with the crime of infanticide instead of murder if "the balance of her mind was disturbed". Infanticide has smaller consequences than murder, and men cannot be charged with infanticide. In New Zealand, there has been at least one case of a man being charged with murder where a woman would have been charged with infanticide.

Law professor Kevin Dawkins from Otago University wants infanticide to be replaced by new legislation that applies to both female and male offenders.

Some people have argued that this law contributes to a misconception that childbirth or breastfeeding can contribute to insanity, and have called for the law to be replaced with one that recognises that people with certain mental illnesses are capable in controlling their actions.

==== Adoption ====
The Adoption Act 1955 prevents sole males from adopting female children unless the male is the father, or under "special circumstances". In 2016, the Human Rights Review Tribunal ruled that the provision was inconsistent with the Bill of Rights.

== Violence ==
Intimate partner violence and sexual violence is a significant contributor to gender inequality in New Zealand. Violence against women is classed as gender-based violence as it is rooted in gender inequalities between men and women.

The 2025 New Zealand Crime & Victims Survey (NZCVS) found that women and men reported similar level of victimisation (16.5% of women and 15% of men) for personal offences (such as assault). Police statistics show that between May 2017 and February 2026, 52.3% of assault victims were female, 42.3% were male, and 5.4% had no sex stated. The New Zealand Family Violence Study (NZFVS) was conducted in 2019 and found that 11.9% of women and 39.9% of men had experienced non-partner violence in their lifetime. Approximately 29% of women and men reported experiencing partner violence in their lifetime, and 12.4% of women and 2.1% of men reported experiencing sexual partner violence. The Youth19 Survey was a survey of young people approximately 15-18 years old. 50.2% of females and 52.3% of males reported being hit by anyone, 3.7% of females and 7.3% of males reported being hit by their partner, 26.1% of females and 9.7% of males reported unwanted sexual contact.

From 2007-2022, 34% of homicide victims were female and 66% were male. A 2025 review was unable to determine how many of the female deaths were femicide (women killed because they are women). From 2000-2024, the victims of serious non-fatal assaults were 20% female and 80% male.

New Zealand Police statistics report that 21% of people proceeded against for assault were women and 79% were men. However, the NZCVS reports that 36% of victims of assault/robbery and 11% of victims of sexual assault reported to the Police.

Victims & offenders of interpersonal violent crimes in 2024 by gender
	Female Victims	Female Offenders	Male Victims	Male Offenders	N/A* Victims	N/A* Offenders
Assault	52.9%	22.9%	43.4%	77.1%	3.9%	-
Sexual offences	80.9%	3.7%	13.8%	96.3%	5.4%	0.1%
Harm or endanger persons	65.6%	20.6%	24.5%	79.3%	9.9%	0.1%
Robbery, blackmail, and extortion	26.5%	13.5%	66.5%	86.5%	7.0%	-
Total	54.2%	20.3%	41.6%	79.6%	4.2%	>0.1%
Victimisations source: New Zealand Police Proceedings (offender demographics) source: New Zealand Police; Select time period: 1 Jan 2024 to 31 Dec 2024. Victimisations exclude those closed as "no crime" within 30 days of report. Proceeding refers to the first legal action taken against the offender. Victimisations occurring in dwellings are excluded from the data. Note: Murder is not included in victimisations. * N/A refers to instances where the victim's gender was not recorded.

== Employment and the workplace ==
The Ministry of Women has a number of concerns regarding women in the workforce. They are concerned about the gender pay gap, lower pay in women dominated industries, labour market participation, and supporting women in leadership and governance roles.

Men make up 71% of work-related injuries in New Zealand, meaning that men are two times more likely than women to be injured. 96% of workplace deaths are men.

=== Political and public representation ===
New Zealand has had a high level of participation by women in public life and this is evident from the modest female representation in politics and the judiciary. As of 2020, 48% of parliament members are women.

At present there are no adopted quotas and targets to increase the number of women to ensure the equal representation of women in all publicly appointed bodies by the New Zealand Government. Rather, the government has developed a policy of 'soft targets' to promote equal representation. This was criticised by the Human Rights Commission as being insufficient as there is no dedicated machinery to guide it.

=== Employment rates ===
In terms of New Zealand labour force participation, the female unemployment rate is statistically higher than that of men (with the unemployment rate being the highest for Māori and Pacific women). Women generally have higher rates of participation in all categories of unpaid work – within and outside of the household. The amount of part-time workers in New Zealand are three quarters women. Various demographics of women take on more part-time work than men.

The report from the New Zealand census of Women's participation in Government and Professional Life shows 60 percent of women have no position in the top 100 corporations. According to advocacy group Global Women, in 2019, 18 percent of companies listed on NZX did not have female representation in their board. As of September 2020, 22.5 percent of directors on NZX listed companies are women, with the top 50 listed companies having higher proportions of female directors (31.6%) than all other listed companies (15.9%).

=== Pay ===
New Zealand's gender pay gap decreased from 8.2% in the June 2024 quarter to 5.2% in the June 2025 quarter.

=== Unpaid work ===
As of 2022, New Zealand women average 264 minutes of unpaid work each day, while men average 141 minutes. Unpaid work includes housework, shopping, child and adult care, volunteering, travel related to household activities and other unpaid work. Approximately 63 percent of women's work in New Zealand is unpaid, compared to 35 percent of men's work.

== Education ==
=== The gender gap in secondary education ===
Overall NCEA attainment rates in 2024 show that female leavers outperform male leavers in all 3 levels, with the gender gap being highest in NCEA Level 3 (59.5% of female leavers and 51.6% of male leavers attained the qualification).

School leaver attainment in New Zealand, 2014-24
	NCEA Level 1		NCEA Level 2		NCEA Level 3		University Entrance	
	Female	Male	Female	Male	Female	Male	Female	Male
2014	90.2%	87.3%	82.7%	76.5%	59.8%	45.0%	46.0%	32.9%
2015	91.4%	88.2%	84.5%	78.1%	62.6%	47.6%	48.3%	34.4%
2016	91.5%	88.5%	84.4%	79.0%	62.5%	49.0%	47.8%	34.5%
2017	91.6%	88.9%	84.9%	79.5%	63.2%	49.2%	47.5%	33.9%
2018	91.7%	88.2%	84.7%	78.5%	63.4%	49.6%	47.4%	33.9%
2019	90.7%	87.2%	83.9%	78.0%	63.3%	50.1%	47.7%	33.5%
2020	90.8%	88.1%	84.7%	79.8%	66.5%	55.1%	51.6%	37.5%
2021	89.7%	86.6%	82.5%	77.2%	63.2%	50.7%	49.0%	34.6%
2022	87.0%	84.4%	78.3%	74.0%	57.5%	48.5%	44.5%	33.4%
2023	85.7%	83.6%	77.3%	73.7%	57.4%	48.4%	44.4%	33.0%
2024	85.4%	83.1%	77.8%	74.5%	59.5%	51.6%	46.0%	34.7%
School leavers include domestic students aged 15+ leaving the New Zealand secondary school system. Students moving overseas permanently are included. International fee-paying and exchange students, and deceased students are excluded.

The gender gap between female and male students is most prevalent in reading and writing. In mathematics and science, there is no significant gap between the genders. The limited research done on the modern gender gap in New Zealand's school system suggests that while boys are not under-achieving overall, they face unique challenges with engaging in education. Males are more prone to disruptive and inattentive classroom behaviours, leading to a male educational disadvantage. Gender stereotypes detonate reading as a 'feminine' behaviour, leading to pressure on boys to avoid the activity.

=== Tertiary education ===
As of 2023, the share of population between ages 25 to 34 years who attained tertiary education is 51.8% of women and 40% of men. In STEM subjects (Science, Technology, Engineering and Mathematics) women make up 43% of graduates, one of the highest levels in the OECD.

=== Not in education, employment, or training ===
Women outnumber men for 20 to 24-year-olds who are not in employment, education or training (NEET), 18.4% of women and 12.4% of men in 2024. The gap can be attributed to the proportion of women who are engaging in caregiving activities full time. From 2004 to 2024, the gender gap has significantly declined, corresponding with the declining number of women engaged in caregiving activities. NEET women engaging in caregiving activities went from 16,300 in the March 2004 quarter to 9,900 in the March 2024 quarter.

== Family assets and resources ==
The Administration Act 1976 (section 77) provides for equal inheritance rights for sons and daughters and there is no evidence of discrimination in practice, or under any informal customary systems.

New Zealand women have the right to non-discrimination in the ownership and access to land. The Maori Land Act 1993 provides for gender equality in the control and use of land and resources. In terms of non-land assets, there are no restrictions on their equal rights to property, regardless of marital status.

Women also have the equal right to financial services pursuant to the Human Rights 1993.

== Health ==
On average, women have better health outcomes than men and women generally have a higher life expectancy.

Men and women have equal access to health services.

There are no screening programmes for prostate cancer in New Zealand, but there is for breast cancer. Genomic testing for prostate cancer is not funded whereas it is for those with breast cancer. In terms of research funding, breast cancer receives $12 million per year whereas prostate cancer receives $3 million per year.

=== Suicide ===
The Health New Zealand reports that between 1948 and 2020, 20571 males and 7302 females died from intentional self-harm. For every 100 female suicides, there were 282 male suicides.

=== Life expectancy ===
Life expectancy for 2017-2019 was 80 years for males and 83.5 years for females.

== Homelessness ==
In Auckland in 2018, 83% of people living without shelter were male, 15% were female, and 2% had a 'rainbow gender identity'. 44% of people living in temporary accommodation were male, 56% were female and 0.1% had a 'rainbow gender identity'.

Transitional housing is housing for people with nowhere else to stay. A 2025 report showed that for under 30s, there were nearly double the amount of women than men in transitional housing. For the 30-55 age group, there were slightly more women than men, and for over 55-years, there were slightly more men than women.

The table below shows estimates of homelessness from the 2023 Census. These figures are estimates due to the difficulty in counting homeless people.

Severe housing deprivation, by gender and homelessness category, per 10,000 usual residents, 2023 Census
Homelessness category	Male	Female	Another gender
Without shelter	11.3	8.7	26.9
Temporary accommodation	30.1	23.9	37.4
Sharing someone else's private dwelling	49.3	51.2	59.8
Uninhabitable housing	130.8	148.5	189.9

== Justice system ==
Gender inequalities exist for both men and women in the justice system.

Brown reported that Police studies show that "[o]n average, males were 12% more likely to be prosecuted than females for the same offence." For some offences males were much more likely to be prosecuted. Males were 64% more likely to be prosecuted for 'Threatening Behaviour'. Brown's own research did have enough evidence to conclude that males were more likely to be prosecuted in overall. Brown did find that for some offences males were significantly more likely to be prosecuted, and for others females were more likely to be prosecuted. Males are more likely to be prosecuted for 'dangerous driving' (90% more likely), 'threatening behaviour' (110%), and 'property damage' (51%). Females were more likely to be prosecuted for 'possessing illicit drugs' (32%) and 'trespassing' (29%).

Tolmie reports that women were more likely to be filtered out of the justice system at natural attrition points. Women were less likely to be sent to prison, they receive shorter sentences and are more likely to be released on parole.

Jeffries found sex disparities in several areas of the justice system.

In all but one case (the initial decision to imprison) sex was found to have a direct impact on the judicial outcomes investigated including: length of imprisonment term, remand status, length of custodial remand and bail conditions. With other factors statistically controlled, women's imprisonment terms were found to be substantially shorter than men's.

Patterson found inequities for males in sexual assault cases.

In terms of police decision-making processes, compared to males, a smaller proportion of females proceeded to "court action" for their offences. Furthermore, the severity of sentences handed down to males was greater than those handed down to females, both generally and when the sexual offence could be directly matched.

In March 2026, 92.4% of prisoners were male and 7.6% were female.

=== Police TASER use ===
A review of Police TASER use found that officers were more likely to use TASERs against men. "In some cases, men were TASERed for non-compliance, or to gain control over a situation when no physical threat or weapon was present".

=== Treatment in prison ===
On average, women were more likely to be segregated (solitary confinement) in prison. In 2019, there were 147 segregation placements per 100 men prisoners, and 255 per 100 women prisoners. The worst prisons for segregation were Mount Eden Correctional facility (men) with 405.5 segregation placements per 100 men prisoners and Auckland Region Women's Corrections Facility with 285 segregation placements per 100 women prisoners.

== Gender attitudes ==
Attitudes towards gender inequality and related topics are measured biannually by the National Council of Women of New Zealand and Research New Zealand. The majority of New Zealander's surveyed from 2017-2025 agreed that "gender equality in Aotearoa New Zealand is a fundamental right". The group least likely to agree with the statement were young men (18-34 years), with only 67% agreeing, over 10% less than any other age group regardless of gender. Young men were also the most likely to agree that "gender equality has already been achieved", and that "gender equality has gone too far".

Agreement with select statements in %, by age within gender, 2025
	Females 18-24	Males 18-24	Females 35-64	Males 35-64	Females 65+	Males 65+
Gender equality is a fundamental right in Aotearoa New Zealand	78%	67%	83%	78%	83%	85%
Sexism is still a significant issue in Aotearoa New Zealand	64%	55%	67%	49%	59%	65%
Gender equality has already been achieved for the most part in Aotearoa New Zealand	41%	56%	38%	50%	48%	51%
Gender equality has gone too far in Aotearoa New Zealand	15%	33%	16%	30%	18%	14%
Source: National Council of Women

=== Gender stereotypes ===
Gender stereotypes are generalised beliefs about attributes or characteristics that women and men do or should hold. Gender stereotypes can limit women and men's capacity when it comes to personal abilities, career development, and general life choices. The majority of New Zealanders surveyed held gender equitable attitudes when questioned about gender stereotypes. However, men were more likely than women to agree with gender stereotypes that negatively impact both women and men. 17% of men surveyed believed "it is more important for women to be physically attractive than men" compared to 9% of women surveyed. More male than female respondents believed that outdoor household chores, such as mowing the lawn, driving to family outings, and putting the rubbish out is "more appropriate for boys and men". Only 55% of respondents believed being a builder was suitable for all genders, 47% of male respondents and 38% of female believed it was more suitable for men. When it came to school subjects, more male than female respondents believed that fashion and textiles technology is more suited to women while materials technology is more suited to men. 66% of women surveyed believed that it is ok for boys to play with dolls whereas only 46% of men agreed.

=== Attitudes to rape ===
From 2017-2025, most attitudes about rape, specifically rape myths, did not significantly change over time. However, agreement to the statement "rape happens when a man's sex drive is out of control" has increased from 25% in 2017 to 36% in 2025.

== See also ==
- Gender pay gap in New Zealand
- Feminism in New Zealand
- Domestic violence in New Zealand
