= Vanisa Dhiru =

New Zealand not-for-profit leader

Vanisa Dhiru MNZM JP
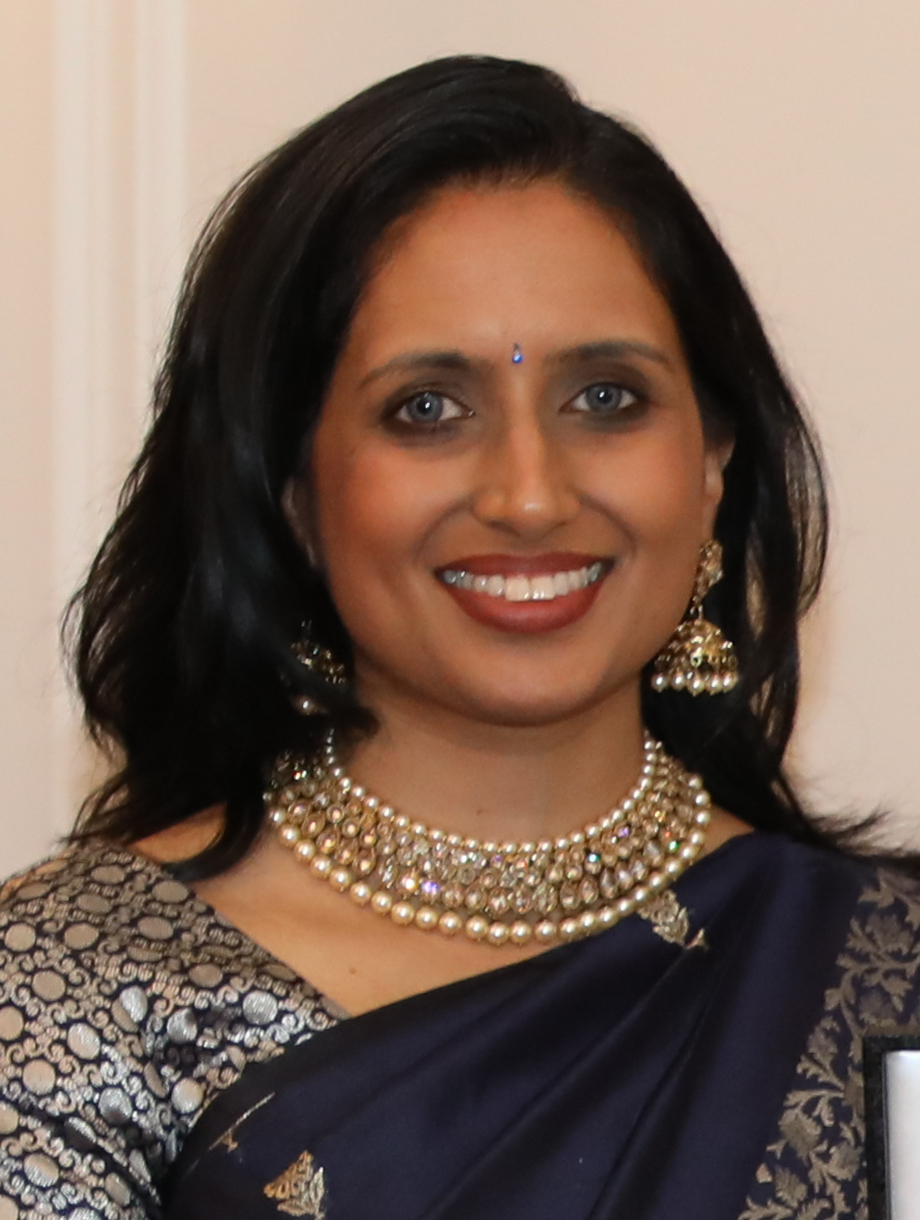
- Dhiru in 2021
- Occupation: Not-for-profit leader

Vanisa Dhiru is an executive leader in the not-for-profit sector in New Zealand. In 2017, she was appointed the national president of the National Council of Women of New Zealand.

== Early life ==
Dhiru was born and raised in Palmerston North, to Indian parents; her father was born in Gujarat, India, and her mother was born in New Zealand. Her parents owned and ran two convenience stores in the town. She was inspired by her parents to volunteer for school and community activities from a young age. In 1999, Dhiru moved to Wellington to attend Victoria University of Wellington.

== Career ==
After graduating, Dhiru worked for New Zealand Trade and Enterprise. Dhiru was the youngest president of the YWCA of Wellington and Hutt Valley and represented New Zealand twice at World YWCA young women's forums. She has served on the board of a number of charities such as Inspiring Stories Trust, Dress for Success Wellington and Trade Aid. In her work for Trade Aid, she travelled to India and Bangladesh to record stories of the Trade Aid partner groups which she then delivered to school, community and business groups to promote Fair Trade. In 2006, Dhiru entered the Miss India New Zealand beauty pageant as Miss Trade Aid, to promote the organisation and raise funds; she raised over $1,000 for the charity. She also worked on the Make Wellington Fair Trade campaign, which resulted, in 2009, in Wellington City Council committing to become a Fair Trade City. She has also been a member of the Wellington Ethnic Women's Group and the Wellington Indian Association.

In 2011, Dhiru was appointed chief executive of Volunteering New Zealand. In 2013, she became a global fellow of the International Young Leaders Network of the BMW Foundation, the only New Zealander in the network. In 2015, Dhiru was appointed executive director of 2020 Communications Trust, an organisation focused on supporting digital literacy for all New Zealanders. Dhiru also sits on the Victoria University of Wellington Business School Advisory Board and on advisory groups for the Ministry of Social Development and the Ministry for Women.

Dhiru was the vice-president of the National Council of Women of New Zealand from 2015 to 2017, when she was appointed president.

=== Recognition ===
In 2010, Dhiru was a finalist in the Kiwibank Young New Zealander of the Year Awards. In the 2021 New Year Honours, Dhiru was appointed a Member of the New Zealand Order of Merit, for services to community and gender rights.
