= 1917 Napier mayoral election =

Local election in New Zealand

- 25 April 1917
- Turnout: 2,726
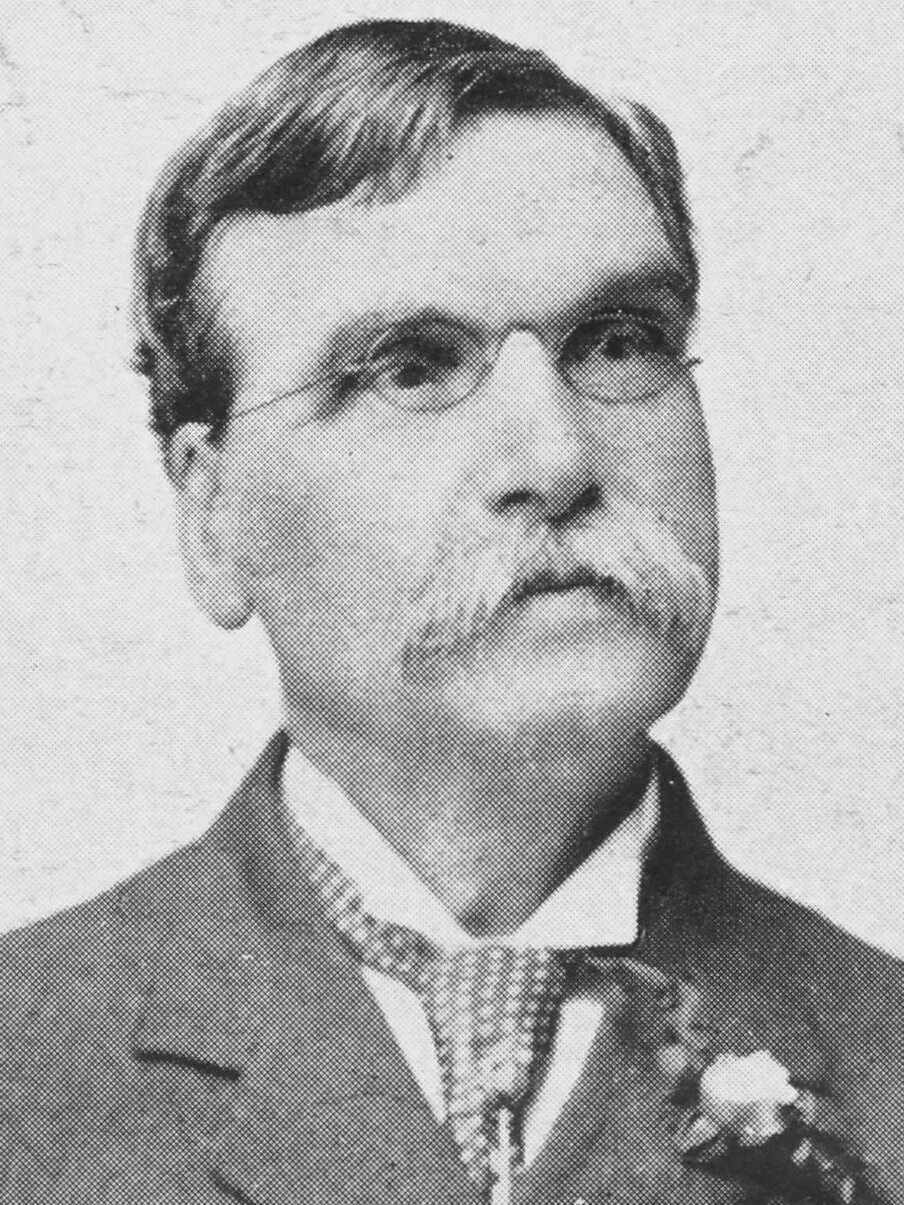

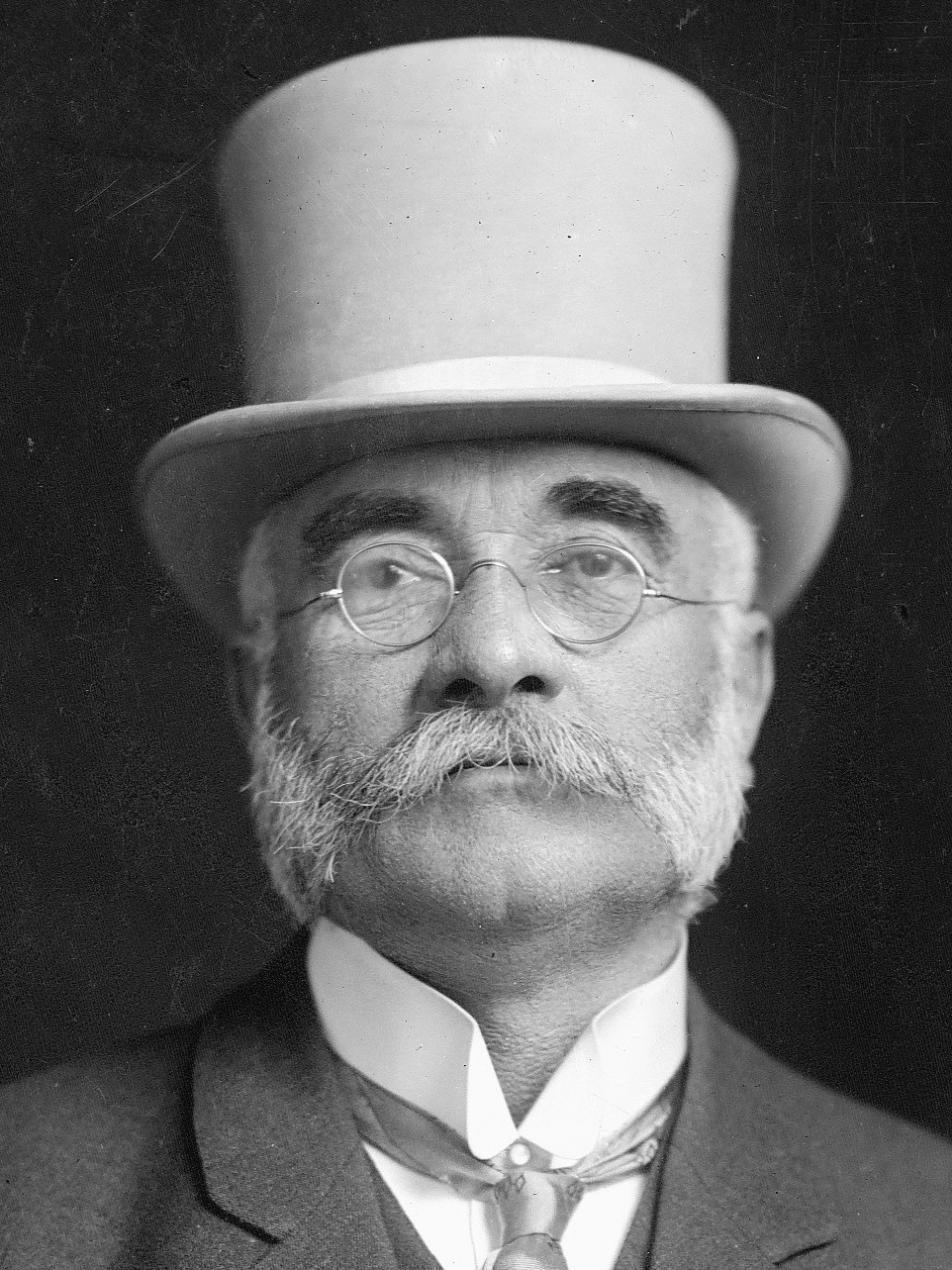
Candidate	Henry Hill	Vigor Brown
Party	Labour	Independent
Popular vote	1,561	1,165
Percentage	57.26	42.73
Mayor before election
Vigor Brown
Elected mayor
Henry Hill

The Napier mayoral election, 1917 was held to determine the next Mayor of Napier. At this time Napier held their local elections biennially. In 1915, elections were held for the Mayor of Napier plus other local government positions. The polling was conducted using the standard first-past-the-post electoral method.

== Background and candidates ==
Finances were the major talking point of the contest. The council had an overdraft of around £20,000 caused by huge public works expenditure.

=== Henry Hill ===
Hill practiced law in Napier, but made his name as a school inspector and earning a good reputation for public service. He was elected as a Napier City Councillor in 1915. Hill was also a member of the Hawke's Bay Hospital Board, the Hawke's Bay Electric Power Board, the Napier High School board of governors.

=== Vigor Brown ===
Vigor Brown was a prominent figure in Napier in the opening decades of the twentieth century. His career stretched back to 1898 when he was elected to both the Napier Harbour Board and the Napier Borough Council. He was the incumbent mayor, having held office for a decade when he was first elected in 1907.

== Results ==
The following table gives the election results:

Napier mayoral election, 1917
Party	Candidate	Votes	%	±%
Labour	Henry Hill	1,561	57.26	
Independent	Vigor Brown	1,165	42.74	
Majority		396	14.52	
Turnout		2,726		

Brown was the first to declare his intention to stand in the next mayoral election in 1919, with Hill then acceding to a requisition by ratepayers. Brown defeated Hill by a very small margin; the initial count had him three votes ahead, but in the final declaration, this increased to a sixteen vote victory (1818 votes versus 1802).
