= Marianne Allen Tasker =

New Zealand domestic servant and trade unionist (1852–1911)

- Born: 13 November 1852; Brighton, Sussex, England
- Died: 4 February 1911 (aged 58); Wellington, New Zealand
- Organization: Women's Democratic Union
- Children: 7

Marianne Allen Tasker (née Manchester, 13 November 1852 – 4 February 1911) was a New Zealand domestic servant, feminist, community leader and trade unionist.

== Biography ==
Tasker was born in Brighton, Sussex, England in 1852. Her mother had died when Tasker was eight.

Tasker emigrated to New Zealand in 1870 on the ship Excelsior. She was one of a group of single women from Britain travelling on an assisted passage from the Hawke's Bay provincial government to work as a domestic servant. She kept a journal during the journey.

She married John Tasker, a clerk with the Armed Constabulary, on 11 May 1874 in Gisborne. She moved with her family to Wellington in 1879.

Tasker represented the Women's Democratic Union in the founding year of the National Council of Women of New Zealand (1896), and served as a vice president from 1897 to 1900. She organised the 1898 Wellington conference of the Council and gave the opening address with Kate Sheppard. She also urged the Council to support measures for labour legislation over working hours and pay, such as the re-enacting of the Master and Apprentice Bill (1889) the Eight Hour Bill (1884) and the Minimum Wage Bill (1894).

Tasker was also a founding member of the Anti-Chinese League and the Wellington branch of the New Zealand Workers' Union.

Tasker died on 4 February 1911 in Wellington, aged 56. She was survived by seven children.
