= Henry Hill (educationalist) =

New Zealand educationalist and politician

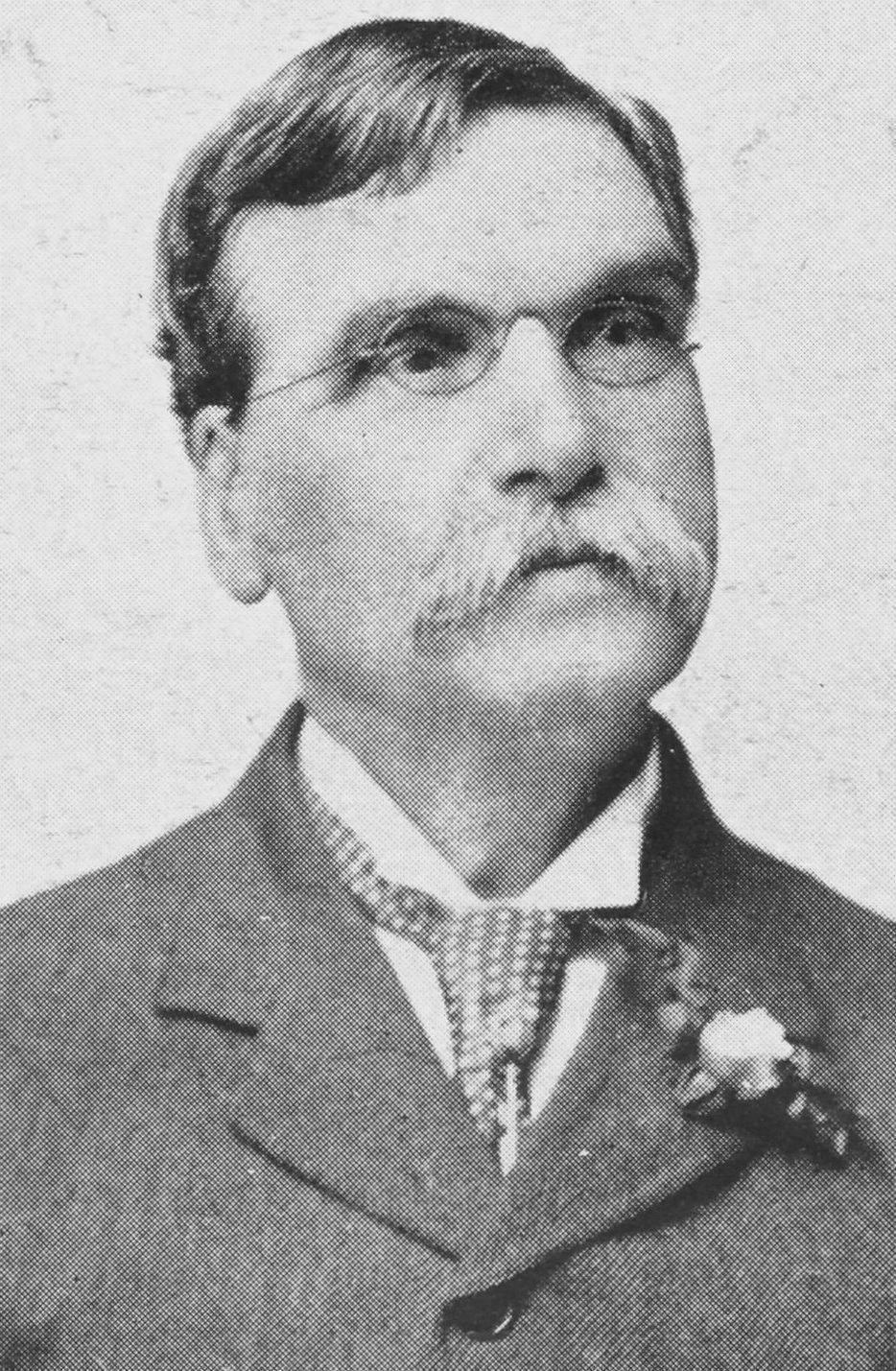

9th Mayor of Napier
- In office 1917–1919
- Deputy: Arthur McCarthy
- Preceded by: Vigor Brown
- Succeeded by: Vigor Brown

Personal details
- Born: 24 October 1849 Wollescote, Worcestershire, England
- Died: 15 July 1933 (aged 83) Napier, New Zealand
- Party: Labour
- Spouse: Emily Hill
- Children: 8 (1 adopted)

Henry Hill (24 October 1849 – 15 July 1933), also known as Henry Thomas Hill, was a New Zealand school inspector, educationalist, and Mayor of Napier.

== Early career ==
Hill was born on 24 October 1849 in Wollescote, Worcestershire, England. He signed an employment contract with the Canterbury Provincial Council which stipulated that he had to be married, so he proposed to his friend Emily Knowles less than one month before emigrating. They were married on 23 July 1873 and on 3 August, they departed for Lyttelton on the Merope. He was headmaster of Christchurch East School from 1875 to 1878. He studied part-time and graduated in 1878 with a Bachelor of Arts. This allowed his to apply for the role of inspector of schools for the education board in the Hawke's Bay. The family moved to Napier by mid-1878.

Hill is believed to have been the first European to climb to the crater of Mount Ruapehu.

== Political career ==
=== Local politics ===
Hill moved to the East Coast of the North Island and practised as a qualified lawyer, there becoming involved in politics. Hill became a Napier City Councillor in 1915 serving until he was elected Mayor of Napier in 1917 when he beat the incumbent, Vigor Brown. Hill's time as mayor was marked by attempts to increase public works and improve the city's finances, for which he received high praise on this prudent, tactful approach. In 1919 Hill hoped this good record would ensure his re-election, but was voted out of office when Brown in turn defeated him by mere 16 votes. Hill also served as a member of the Hawke's Bay Hospital Board, the Hawke's Bay Electric Power Board, the Napier High School board of governors.

=== National politics ===
He stood as a candidate for the Napier electorate in Parliament several times. While generally polling well, he never won the seat. He stood as the Labour candidate in 1911, and as an "Independent Progressive" candidate in 1919. Hill also received support and endorsement from the Reform Party, in an effort to help oust the Liberal incumbent Vigor Brown.
