= Lucy Lovell-Smith =

Prominent member of women's suffrage movement in New Zealand

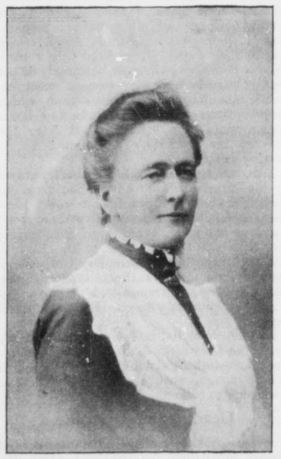
- Born: Lucy Masey Smith; 1 June 1861; Christchurch, New Zealand
- Died: 3 March 1936 (aged 74); St. Albans, New Zealand
- Known for: women's rights and temperance activism, church leadership
- Parent(s): Eleanor Phoebe McLeod and James Thomas Smith

Lucy Masey Lovell-Smith (née Smith; 1 June 1861 – 3 March 1936) was a New Zealand editor, feminist, temperance and welfare worker. She wrote under the pen-name "Vesta" when contributing to newspapers about women's rights. In 1926, she changed her surname to Lovell-Smith.

== Early life ==
Lucy Masey Smith was born in Christchurch, New Zealand, in 1861, the fifth of six children of James Thomas Smith and Eleanor Phoebe McLeod Smith. Eleanor McLeod Smith joined the Christchurch chapter of the Women's Christian Temperance Union New Zealand (WCTU NZ) when it was formed in 1885 during the organizing efforts of Mary Greenleaf Clement Leavitt.

== Temperance and women's rights activist ==
Smith signed the WCTU NZ's petition for woman suffrage in 1893. Her brother William Sidney Smith (1852–1929) was also an advocate for woman suffrage, and his printing business produced the White Ribbon journal for the WCTU NZ from 1895 when it started. Her sister-in-law Mary Jane "Jennie" Cumberworth Smith (1848–1924) served as the founding business manager of the White Ribbon.

Lucy Smith edited the White Ribbon from 1903 to 1908, and like the WCTU NZ, her brief went much wider than temperance. Under the banner ‘For God, Home, and Humanity,’ she published articles advocating equal pay for equal work, wages for housewives, professional education for girls, vegetarian diets and dress reform. She also advocated for the political organisation of women, issuing articles such as 'Wanted - A Woman's Party' which called for political unity among women's rights organisers.

At the 1905 meeting of the WCTU NZ, Lucy Smith objected to the majority view in support of a clause in the Electoral Act 1902 rendering nomination papers for women invalid. In an article published in the White Ribbon, Lucy Smith attacked her view on the double standard in the qualifications for nomination between men and women.

Smith attended the first meeting of the National Council of Women of New Zealand (NCWNZ) in 1896, and by 1927 had become the secretary of the Christchurch branch. She was editor of the NCW Bulletin in 1928–29. and the WCTU NZ section in The Prohibitionist.

She was very active in her church, serving as Sunday school teacher and Bible Class leader as well as congregational steward of the St. Albans Wesleyan Church. She was also employed in a family printing business, fulfilling administrative and proofreading duties. Much of her work for women's rights however was behind the scenes, working closely with her sisters-in-law Jennie Smith and Kate Sheppard, and her mother Eleanor McLeod Smith.

== Death ==
Lucy Masey Smith followed her brother's lead in changing her surname to Lovell-Smith in 1926. She died in her home on 3 March 1936, and she is buried in the Linwood Cemetery, Christchurch.

== See also ==
- Kate Sheppard
- National Council of Women of New Zealand
- Women's Christian Temperance Union New Zealand
- Women's suffrage in New Zealand
