= Christchurch East School =

School in Christchurch, New Zealand

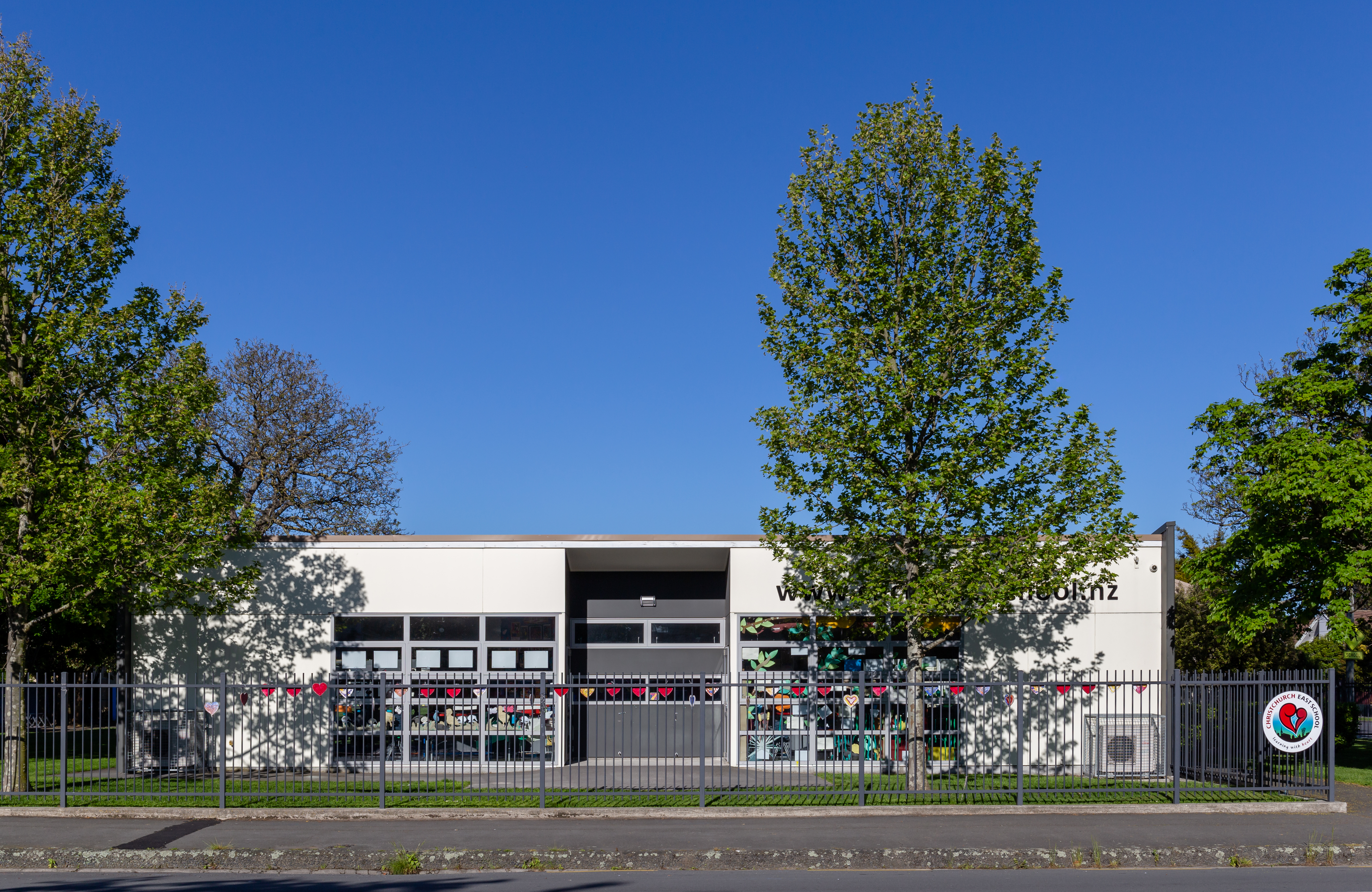
- Christchurch East School in 2019

Location
- 311 Gloucester Street, Christchurch; 43.5295°S 172.6470°E

Information
- Type: State Co-educational Primary and Intermediate school
- Established: 1873
- Ministry of Education Institution no.: 3317
- Principal: Mike Agar
- Enrolment: 294 (July 2026)
- Socio-economic decile: 3
- Website: chcheast.school.nz

Christchurch East School, initially referred to as East Christchurch School, is located in the central city of Christchurch, New Zealand.

== History ==
The Canterbury Provincial Council passed The Education Ordinance 1873 in June of that year to consolidate law relating to public education. As a consequence, the Christchurch East School district was formed with the purpose of forming several new schools, and the committee held its first meeting on 13 August 1873. The committee approved plans for a school to be built in Gloucester Street on 15 December 1873; this school was named East Christchurch School.

From 1875 to 1878, Henry Hill was its headmaster, and his wife Emily Hill was head of the infants' department. The school had its centennial celebrations from 5 to 7 October 1973. Avonside School became part of this school at some point.

In March 2009, education minister Anne Tolley announced $41 million for school buildings, distributed to 81 schools around the country through the first allocation of property funding under the government's recently announced infrastructure package to address lack of space or need for new school buildings. Christchurch East School is one of the recipients.

The school was considered likely to be damaged in the February 2011 Christchurch earthquake, but it escaped major damage.

== Notable alumni ==
- Elizabeth Herriott, botanist and first woman lecturer at Canterbury College
- Henry James Nicholas, recipient of the Victoria Cross
- Ada Wells, suffragette (attended Avonside School)

== See also ==
- List of schools in Canterbury, New Zealand
