= National Council of Women of New Zealand =

Charitable organisation supporting gender equality in NZ

- Te Kaunihera Wahine o Aotearoa
- Abbreviation: NCWNZ
- Formation: 13 April 1896; 130 years ago
- Founded at: Christchurch, New Zealand
- Type: Umbrella organisation
- Legal status: Incorporated society and registered charity
- Purpose: Gender equality in New Zealand
- Headquarters: Wellington, New Zealand
- President: Suzanne Manning (2021–present)
- Website: ncwnz.org.nz

The National Council of Women of New Zealand (Māori: Te Kaunihera Wahine o Aotearoa) was established in 1896, three years after women in New Zealand won the right to the vote, as an umbrella organisation uniting a number of different women's societies that existed in New Zealand at that time. Its founding president was Kate Sheppard, who had led the campaign for women's suffrage. The NCWNZ went into recess in 1906 but was reformed in 1919. As of 2021, the NCWNZ remains a leading and influential organisation that works to achieve gender equality in New Zealand. Since 1896, members have agreed resolutions by majority vote at national conferences, which form policies for the NCWNZ's work. These resolutions inform submissions made by the NCWNZ to Parliament, government departments and other organisations.

== History ==
=== Establishment of the Council and early years (1896–1906) ===
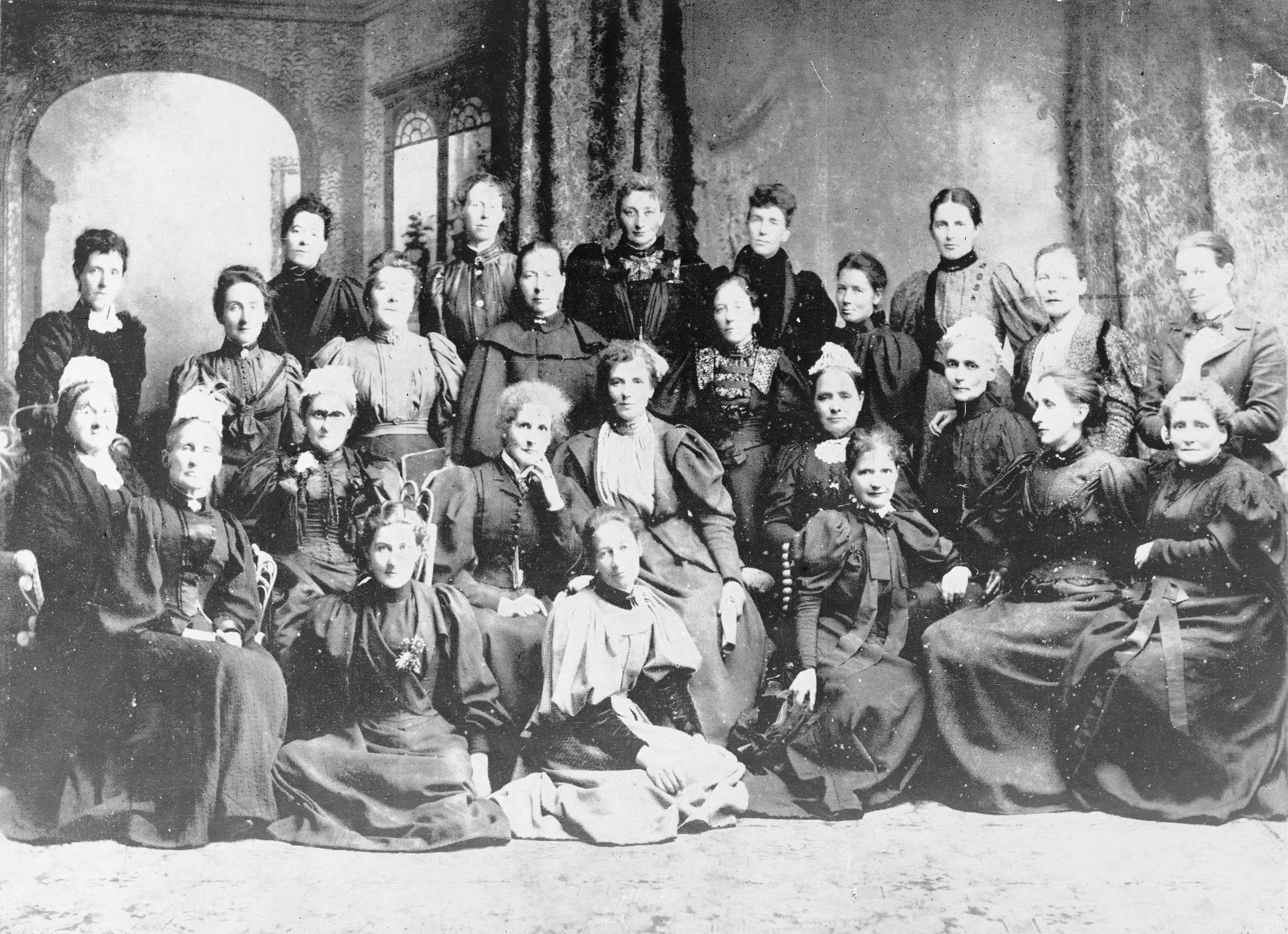
National Council of Women at the inaugural meeting in Christchurch in April 1896

In 1894, while visiting England, Sheppard was asked by Eva McLaren, the foreign corresponding secretary of the International Council of Women, to form a New Zealand branch of the council. On her return to New Zealand, she found that Marion Hatton and Ada Wells had both suggested that a co-ordinating body be set up for the various New Zealand women's societies.

The first meeting of the National Council of Women took place on 13 April 1896 and was attended by around 25 women representing 11 different women's societies. Its aims were to "unite all organised societies of women for mutual counsel and co-operation in the attainment of justice and freedom for women, and for all that made for the good of humanity; to encourage the formation of societies of women engaged in trades, professions, and in social and political work; and to affiliate with other national councils of women for the purpose of facilitating international Conferences and co-operation". The women in attendance were mainly middle-class and several were teachers or former teachers.

There was much initial interest from members of Parliament and other commentators. George Hutchison stated that, "Depend upon it, the resolutions passed at that convention deserve the most respectful consideration." On the other hand, Thomas Mackenzie suggested that the NCWNZ was made up of "a few unsettled women" who "in no way represent our best women". The council received attention from the press and was frequently referred to in the newspapers as "the Women's Parliament".

Sheppard was elected as the first president. Some early frictions arose because Anna Stout, the founder of the Women's Franchise League, had expected that she would be president of the organisation, given her husband's title and position as a leading politician in New Zealand, and indeed she had been offered that role by McLaren prior to the first meeting. Other founding members of the NCWNZ included: Margaret Sievwright, founder of the Gisborne branch of the Woman's Christian Temperance Union; Annie Schnackenberg, president of Woman's Christian Temperance Union during the suffrage campaign; Wilhelmina Sherriff Bain, president of Canterbury Women's Institute; and Ada Wells, a founder of the Canterbury Women's Institute. On Sheppard's recommendation, Emily Hill became treasurer in 1903. Sarah Page was the organisation's secretary in 1905–06.

At its early meetings, the NCWNZ's resolutions focussed on the need for legal equality for men and women, in areas such as marriage and employment. The NCWNZ resolved that women should be eligible for election to Parliament, appointment as police officers and for jury service. It also made various resolutions to support the moral reform of society; for example, that the age of consent be raised, that homes be established for alcoholics, that the liquor laws be more strongly enforced, that children be freely educated for longer and that capital punishment be abolished. Like many women's groups at the time, the NCWNZ was committed to temperance. The NCWNZ said that the state was "a family extended" and that they wished "to bring the woman spirit and the home atmosphere into the affairs as well of the State as of the parish".

The NCWNZ had some early successes; for example, in 1896 new legislation raised the age of consent and permitted women to become lawyers, and in 1898 divorce conditions were made equal for both genders. Other ambitions took longer: women were not permitted to stand for Parliament until 1919 and equal pay was not made a legal requirement in the private sector until 1972. In 1897, Stout left the NCWNZ, claiming that it was not truly representative because it lacked working class and provincial membership. With her departure the NCWNZ was weakened because it lost access to political circles.

=== Recess (1906–1918) ===
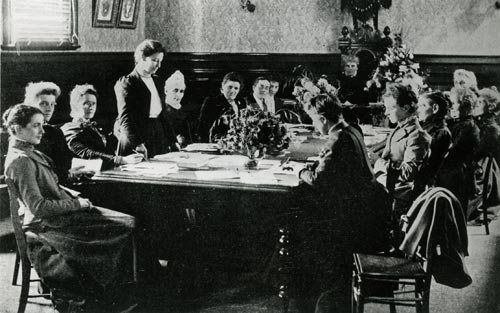
Ada Wells addresses a meeting of the NCWNZ, 1901

By the early 1900s, the NCWNZ was dealing with disagreements between members and wider controversies about matters such as eugenics, New Zealand's involvement in the Second Boer War, whether women should be permitted to stand for Parliament, and the economic independence of married women. Ethel Benjamin, New Zealand's first female lawyer, also criticised the NCWNZ for passing resolutions unanimously after only superficial discussions. To some extent, the widely held belief that the NCWNZ had achieved most of its goals also weakened the case for its continuation. It was viewed as unnecessary to further disrupt the status quo, and many of the leading activists were ageing or suffering from ill-health. After its last convention in 1902 in Napier, the NCWNZ went into recess in 1906.

In the absence of the NCWNZ there was no overarching women's organisation in New Zealand. The Woman's Christian Temperance Union focussed on prohibition rather than feminism, and newer organisations such as the Plunket movement focussed on family and maternal aspects. Some New Zealand feminists continued to work with the International Council of Women, and Sheppard was elected as an honorary vice-president in 1909.

=== Revival (1918–1945) ===
The NCWNZ was revived when Sheppard, Jessie Mackay and Christina Henderson set up a preliminary committee and contacted prominent women around the country. A preliminary meeting of regional representatives was held in April 1918, and a full conference was held after the end of World War I in September 1919. The new NCWNZ had a change in structure and saw the development of branches; instead of local organisations being affiliated directly to the national organisation, they were affiliated to the appropriate regional branch. There were eight branches around the country by 1925 and fourteen by 1940. Sheppard was president for the first year and was followed by Ellen Melville, New Zealand's second female lawyer.

World War I contributed to the revival of the NCWNZ; New Zealand women were concerned about perceived moral decline of New Zealand's youth and the rise of venereal disease. New Zealand was a very different place by the time the NCWNZ reconvened than it had been in 1906. The war and urbanisation had changed society and the position of women. More women were receiving higher education and there were more women in the workforce (almost a quarter of all women in New Zealand) but few of these were married. Women were still very firmly placed in the family context with much of their secondary schooling and in some cases even university education focusing on home sciences. There was also a significant pay differentiation for female-oriented employment.

Although the new NCWNZ was conservative when compared with the pre-1906 NCWNZ, it was still more radical than the government of the day was willing to accept and any advances towards equality were made slowly and with difficulty. A woman's right to sit in Parliament and to sit on a jury were two issues in which New Zealand was lagging behind Great Britain, and the NCWNZ campaigned strongly for both; ultimately, the first female MP was Elizabeth McCombs in 1933, and women were not permitted to sit on juries until 1943. Issues which were more controversial within the NCWNZ itself included the compulsory notification of venereal disease. An article in the NCWNZ Bulletin in 1928 listed "What New Zealand Women Want": women on juries and the Prisons Board, female police, a female co-censor of films, and a female member of New Zealand's delegation to the League of Nations. Women's concerns included the high maternal death rate of women and high septic abortion rate, the lack of equal salaries and status for male and female teachers, conditions in schools, and pay and promotion in the civil service.

In the 1930s, during the Depression, the Auckland branch of the NCWNZ co-operated with the YWCA to create the first register of unemployed women. The Christchurch branch set up a programme to teach cookery to unemployed young women which produced meals for needy families. The Dunedin branch established a Women's Unemployment Committee which assisted women with finding jobs, particularly in domestic service.

During World War II, the NCWNZ collected nearly 70 tons of food for Britain, after a suggestion of the Dunedin branch became a national initiative. Local branches set up committees to collect clothing and funds to help war victims. During this period, representatives of nationally organised societies started attending NCWNZ meetings so that the NCWNZ could take advantage of their expertise and address any concerns.

=== Post-war period and late 20th century (1945–1996) ===
The post-war period was a period of rapid growth and structural change for the NCWNZ. It was marked by one very important issue – equal pay for equal work. In 1957 the Council for Equal Pay and Opportunity (CEPO) was formed, which aimed "to bring about as soon as possible the full implementation of the principles of equal pay for equal work (or the rate for the job) and equal opportunity for women in all spheres of employment in New Zealand", and the NCWNZ became a member. Equal pay became a reality in the public sector in 1960 but the private sector was not required to follow suit until 1972 with the passing of the Equal Pay Act; NCWNZ was pivotal in both campaigns. Other major issues of the post-war era included jury service on the same terms for women as for men (an issue until 1976), the support of censorship, opposition to pornography and to alcohol and drug abuse, opposition to nuclear weapons, environmental issues (in the 1970s and 1980s) and the level of violence in New Zealand society (in the 1990s).

As the NCWNZ's workload increased, the structure of the organisation developed. In 1959 the organisation was registered as an incorporated society. Mavis Tiller, president from 1966 to 1970, was a key modernising figure; she enhanced the role of the Parliamentary Watch Committee, which became an effective advocate for women by making submissions on bills and discussion papers. Tiller's work to dispose of the 1966 resolution that the Council only make submissions to Parliament in exceptional circumstances led to a growth in importance and extended terms of reference for the Parliamentary Watch Committee. The NCWNZ has played an important role in making submissions to Parliament ever since. Standing committees were set up to focus on specific areas such as health and education, and to support local branches in these areas. In 1974 NCWNZ purchased its first permanent headquarters in Wellington. The NCWNZ also experimented with different publications and methods of communicating with members: Between 1952 and 1958 the Christchurch-based New Zealand Women in Council was published. Women's Viewpoint magazine was published by the Auckland branch in 1960 and 1961. This became a national magazine and ten issues were published each year through the early 1960s. It was replaced by NCW Quarterly from 1967 to 1975. From 1958 onwards a monthly Circular newsletter was also sent to each member of each branch.

In 1996 the NCWNZ marked its centennial. Historian Dorothy Page published a well-received centennial history, and the organisation established a Centennial Fund based on national fundraising and a generous government grant. The Fund provided ongoing support for the administration of the organisation. It was said at the time that although the NCWNZ could be "disparaged by both the very conservative and the very radical", it remained the voice of thousands of New Zealand women, including groups who would not normally agree.

=== Recent years (1996–present) ===
In the late 1990s and early 2000s the NCWNZ continued its work monitoring debates, researching opinions and drafting submissions to Parliament and other bodies on its core interests of health, social justice and equality. Its role as a delegate-based or umbrella organisation became of lesser importance, as many people became less committed to organised community groups and in consequence women's organisations became dormant or had less interest in formally aligning with the NCWNZ. NCWNZ adjusted its constitution to accommodate individual as well as organisational membership, and focussed its attention on aligning with government and with overseas forums such as the United Nations Convention on the Elimination of All Forms of Discrimination Against Women, for which it produced an NGO Alternate Report. NCWNZ also leads delegations to the Commission on the Status of Women, the International Council of Women, and the latter's Asia Pacific Regional Council meetings.

The 2008 financial crisis had a severe impact on NCWNZ's funding, and in 2009 NCWNZ registered as a charity under the Charities Act 2005. However, in August 2010 NCWNZ was deregistered on the grounds that its work was political and therefore not charitable. The negative impact of this decision threatened NCWNZ's financial viability. In 2016 the High Court affirmed NCWNZ's charitable status and backdated the registration to its date of deregistration.

In April 2015, the Council published an open letter to New Zealand Prime Minister John Key against Key's pulling of a waitress's ponytail. The letter said that while the Council accepted that Key had apologised and had not meant to offend, the incident highlighted that sexism was part of New Zealand's culture and that the government needed to do more to reduce sexism and its effects.

In 2015 the NCWNZ published a white paper, Enabling Women's Potential, which made twelve recommendations for action to achieve substantive equality in New Zealand. As a result of this paper, NCWNZ decided to focus its resources for 2016–17 on addressing the culture of gender inequality in New Zealand, and on researching and monitoring four key areas of inequality: safety and health, economic independence, education, and decision-making. This led to the launch of the Gender Equal NZ movement in September 2017, with three work programmes: the Gender Attitudes Survey, the Gender Dashboard and the Gender Culture Taskforce.

In March 2016, the Council marked the 120th anniversary of its founding. In that year the council was campaigning on equal pay for women and on issues such as social issues, justice and law reform. President Rae Duff commented earlier in the year that the council was seeking more younger members.

In 2018, the Council marked the 125th anniversary of women's suffrage in New Zealand. President Vanisa Dhiru, said: "We are fighting for gender equality because we want all New Zealanders to have the freedom and opportunity to determine their own future. Discrimination can be more subtle than it once was. We see it in our everyday interactions, with gender inequality being revealed in attitudes and assumptions. For some, gender inequality is more obvious. For all of us, the job is not done." In March 2019, the Council took the opportunity on International Women's Day to show support for transgender women and for the inclusion of transgender women's needs in all conversations about gender discrimination. Dhiru said on this occasion: "We are explicitly including trans women and all those who identify as female, as it's important to all to feel included. Trans women are women."

In 2020, Lisa Lawrence was appointed as the NCWNZ's first Māori president. She had served as vice-president since 2017 and had extensive leadership experience in health organisations.

== Membership and officers ==
The NCWNZ has around 200 organisations as members and, as of 2015, had 260 individual members. Members include major and minor New Zealand political parties, religious organisations, pro-choice organisations, national and local women's institutes and groups, and a wide range of other organisations including the New Zealand Women Teachers' Association.

=== National officers in the early years ===
Officers of the National Council of Women of New Zealand 1898–1919
Year	President	Vice presidents	Secretary	Treasurer
1896	Kate Sheppard	Amey Daldy, Marion Hatton, Margaret Sievwright, Marianne Allen Tasker	Ada Wells	none
1897	Kate Sheppard	Amey Daldy, Marion Hatton, Margaret Sievwright, Marianne Allen Tasker	Wilhelmina Sherriff Bain	Clementine Kirby
1898	Amey Daldy	Marion Hatton, Kate Sheppard, Ada Wells	Margaret Sievwright	Jessie Williamson
1899	Kate Sheppard	Amey Daldy, Margaret Sievwright, Marianne Allen Tasker	Ada Wells	Jessie Williamson
1900	Kate Sheppard	Margaret Bullock, Amey Daldy, Margaret Sievwright, Ensign Sparks	Christina Henderson	Jessie Williamson
1901	Margaret Sievwright	Lily Atkinson, Amey Daldy, Kate Sheppard, Ada Wells	Christina Henderson	Jessie Williamson
1902	Margaret Sievwright	Amey Daldy, Emily Hill, Kate Sheppard	Christina Henderson	Jessie Williamson
1905	Kate Sheppard	Lily Atkinson, Amey Daldy, Emily Hill, Ada Wells	Sarah Page; Margaret Sievwright (recording sec'y)	Jessie Williamson
1918	Kate Sheppard	none	Ellen Melville	none
1919	Ellen Melville	Kate Sheppard	Christina Henderson	Sarah Jackson

=== Other notable members and officers ===
- Kate Andersen (1870–1957), teacher, community leader and writer; member from 1919 to 1924
- Rosetta Baume (1871–1934), one of the first women to stand for Parliament in 1919 and a vice-president from 1918 to 1920
- Alice Candy (1888–1977), teacher, academic and historian
- Kate Clark (1847–1926), children's writer, poet, artist and community worker
- Nellie Coad (1883–1974), teacher, community leader, women's advocate and writer
- Miriam Dell (born 1924), president from 1970 to 1974 and founder of the Committee on Women, the forerunner to New Zealand's Ministry for Women
- Vanisa Dhiru (living), president from 2017 to 2019
- Flora Forde (1883–1958), president from 1948 to 1956
- Annie Fraer (1868–1939), president from 1927 to 1931 and one of the first female justices of the peace
- Emily Hill (1847–1930), teacher, temperance worker and suffragist
- Jessie Mackay (1864–1938), poet, journalist, feminist and animal rights activist
- Ellen Melville (1882–1946) was New Zealand's second female lawyer, and the first woman elected to a city council in New Zealand, one of the first women to stand for Parliament in New Zealand, and served from 1919 to 1922 as national president of NCWNZ.
- Dorothy Page (living), historian and academic, author of The National Council of Women, A Centennial History (1996)
- Alison Roxburgh (1934–2020), women's rights advocate and community leader
- Emily Siedeburg (1873–1968), doctor and founder of Dunedin branch
- Mavis Tiller (1901–1989), president from 1966 to 1970
- Gillian Greer (living), Chief Executive from 2017 to 2018

== See also ==
- Gender equality in New Zealand
- List of New Zealand suffragists
- Women in New Zealand
- Women's suffrage in New Zealand
