= Robina Nicol =

New Zealand photographer and suffragist

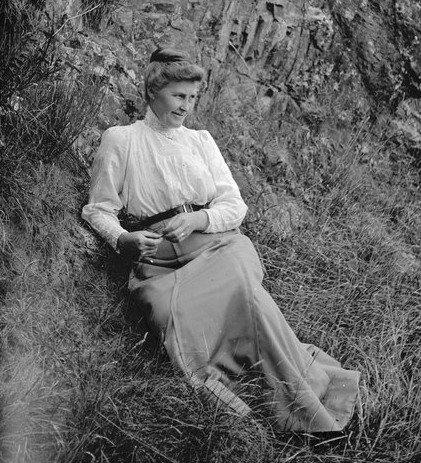
- self portrait
- Born: Robina Sinclair; 7 June 1861; Shetland, Scotland
- Died: 17 July 1942 (aged 81); Wellington, New Zealand
- Known for: Photographer
- Spouse: Alexander Scott Nicol (m. 1885)

Robina Nicol (née Sinclair; 7 June 1861 – 17 July 1942) was a Scottish-born New Zealand photographer and suffragist.

== Life ==
Nicol née Sinclair was born on 7 June 1861 in Shetland, Scotland. Her family emigrated to New Zealand in 1874. In 1885 she married Alexander Scott Nicol in Wellington, New Zealand.

Nicol was a photographer, capturing images of local people and places, especially many images of her family. Although considered an "amateur" because she did not pursue a career in photography, she was active in a time when there were few women photographers in New Zealand. Her photographs were digitised by the Alexander Turnbull Library.

Nichol was a signer of the 1893 Women's Suffrage Petition which ultimately won women the right to vote.

Nichol died on 17 July 1942 in Wellington.

== See also ==
- List of New Zealand suffragists
- List of suffragists and suffragettes
