= Margaret Bullock (journalist) =

NZ writer and feminist (1845-1903)

Margaret Bullock (née Carson), also known as Tua-o-rangi, (4 January 1845 – 17 June 1903) was a New Zealand journalist, writer, feminist and social reformer.

== Biography ==
Although there is little known about Margaret Bullock's early life, at age 24 she married George Bullock, a warehouse-man, on 10 February 1869 in Auckland. After eight years of marriage and the birth of five children, Margaret Bullock became a widow when her husband George died at sea aboard the May Queen in 1877. She then moved her family down to Wanganui to work as a reporter for the Wanganui Chronicle, owned by her brother, Gilbert Carson. As reporter and assistant editor for the Wanganui Chronicle, Bullock became one of New Zealand's first female parliamentary reporters. Under her pseudonym, Tua-o-rangi, Bullock published her first and only novel, Utu: a story of love, hate, and revenge in 1894.

In 1902, Margaret Bullock was diagnosed with cancer and was forced to withdraw from political activism and retired from many of her suffrage organisations and committees. At the age of 57, Bullock died from cancer on 17 June 1903 at her home in Wanganui.

== Political activism ==
In 1893, Bullock founded the Wanganui Women's Franchise League, which worked towards getting the vote for women. Bullock was the vice president of the organisation since its establishment, and eventually served as president from 1893 to 1897. Later, her familiarity with politics eased the passing of the 1893 Electoral Bill which gave New Zealand women the vote. She helped run the National Council of Women of New Zealand, serving as vice president in 1900, and was significant in encouraging political participation in women and defending their rights. Unlike other prominent suffragists at the time, Bullock was not supportive of the Women's Christian Temperance Union (WCTU), but continued to fight for equal rights and equal pay within Wanganui.
