= Emily Hill =

New Zealand politician and suffragist (1847–1930)

- Born: Emily Knowles; 5 September 1847; Lye, Worcestershire, England
- Died: 27 August 1930 (aged 82); Napier, New Zealand
- Occupations: Educator, Suffragist
- Spouse: Henry Hill

Emily Hill (née Knowles, 5 September 1847 – 27 August 1930) was a New Zealand teacher, temperance worker and suffragist.

== Biography ==
Hill was born on 5 September 1847 in Lye, Worcestershire, England. She immigrated to Christchurch in 1873 with her husband Henry Hill, who had proposed to her less than a month before their departure for New Zealand. On 11 October 1875 she received her teacher's certificate from the education office of Canterbury, New Zealand. Between 1875 and 1878, he was headmaster at Christchurch East School and she was in charge of the infants' department. They moved to Napier, where she became prominent in women's suffrage.

Hill died on 27 August 1930 in Napier.
