= Sarah Jackson (teacher) =

Sarah Elizabeth Jackson (6 August 1858 – 9 November 1946) was a New Zealand teacher, industrial school matron and manager, community leader.

Sarah Jackson was born on 6 August 1858 in England and migrated to Auckland in 1881. After teaching in a local primary school she was appointed to manage the Auckland Industrial School. She also served the Auckland branch of the New Zealand Society for the Protection of Women and Children for many years. She took leadership roles in the National Council of Women of New Zealand (NCWNZ), both at the local level in Auckland and was part of the national organization's revitalization in 1918. She served as NCWNZ treasurer from 1919 to 1929.

She died in Auckland on 9 November 1946, and was buried in the St. Luke's Anglican Cemetery in Mount Albert.
