= Margaret Sievwright =

New Zealand feminist, political activist and community leader

- Born: Margaret Home Richardson; 19 March 1844; Pencaitland, Scotland
- Died: 9 March 1905 (aged 60); Gisborne, New Zealand
- Organization: National Council of Woman of New Zealand
- Movement: Women's suffrage
- Spouse: William Sievwright

Margaret Home Sievwright (née Richardson; 19 March 1844 – 9 March 1905) was a New Zealand feminist, political activist and community leader. She was particularly active in the temperance and suffrage movements, and became president of the National Council of Women of New Zealand.

== Early life ==
Margaret Home Sievwright was born in Pencaitland, East Lothian in 1844 to John Richardson, an estate factor, and Jane Law Home. She grew up in and near Edinburgh. She developed liberal humanist ideals. Throughout her life she maintained an enthusiasm for learning and social activism, with a particular focus on improving conditions for women and children. She entered teaching, working at the “ragged schools” in Edinburgh. She left teaching and trained as a nurse under the Florence Nightingale system. As a nurse she joined Josephine Butler’s campaign against the Contagious Disease Acts in both Britain and New Zealand.

In 1878, Sievwright emigrated to Dunedin, New Zealand, initially staying with her brother-in-law. In Wellington, in November 1878, she married widower William Sievwright, from Lerwick, the law partner of Robert Stout They had three daughters, two of whom were from William’s previous marriage. The family moved to Gisborne in 1833.

Sievwright’s daughter, Wilhelmina, married Kate Sheppard’s only child, Douglas Sheppard in 1908.

== Women's suffrage movement ==
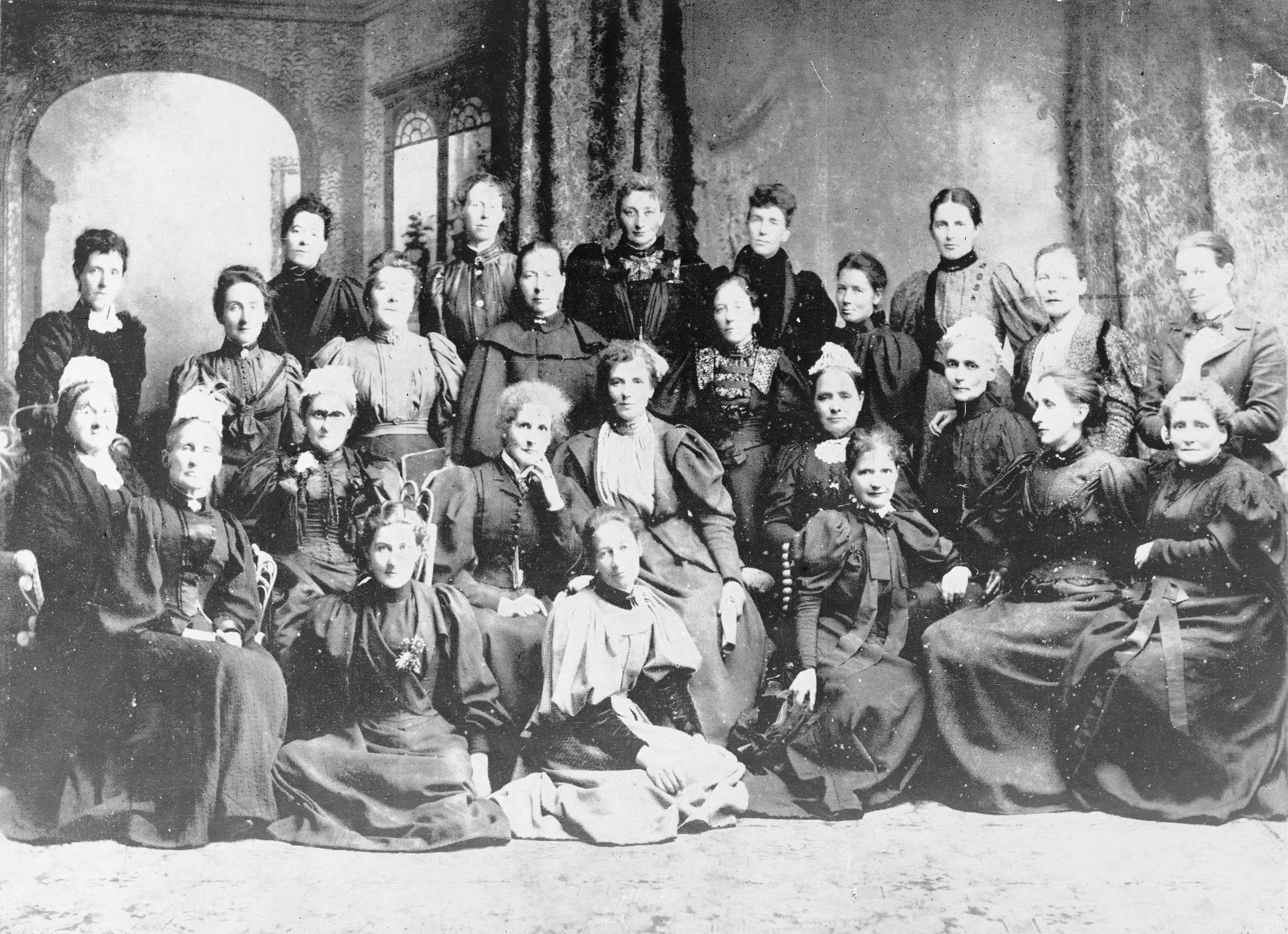
Founding members in the National Council of Women, Christchurch, 1896

In Gisborne, Sievwright was active in the temperance and women’s suffrage movements, with a particular interest in women’s economic independence within marriage. She wrote extensively for women’s political journals and was an active member in various women's organisations. She was the leader of the Gisborne branch of the Women's Christian Temperance Union New Zealand, which was active in advocacy on women’s issues generally and was a major force in the women’s suffrage movement.

Sievwright attended the first meeting of the National Council of Women of New Zealand (NCWNZ) in Christchurch as a representative for the Gisborne Women’s Political League at which she was elected one of four vice-presidents. Sievwright held the office of president of the National Council of Women of New Zealand from 1901 to 1904.

Sievwright also campaigned for disarmament and peace, promoting a pacifist position during the Boer War.

Through her association with the WCTU NZ and the NCWNZ, Sievwright worked closely with Kate Sheppard and Anna Stout. Sievwright’s husband William also supported her work, publishing a defense of feminism and women’s suffrage.

At the NCWNZ session in 1902, introducing her paper ‘The removal of civic and political disabilities of women’ Sievwright stated: "The question is often asked 'What do women want?' We want men to stand out of our sunshine, that is all".

== Memorial ==
Sievwright fell ill in 1905, and died 9 March 1905 in Gisborne. She is buried in a family plot at Makaraka cemetery.

Colleagues of Sievwright erected a drinking fountain in Gisborne, on Peel Street near the Gladstone Road intersection. It was later relocated to 7 Fitzherbert Street. The inscription reads: Ever a friend to the friendless, an uncompromising upholder of all that is merciful, temperate and just.
