= Marion Hatton =

NZ suffragist (1835–1905)

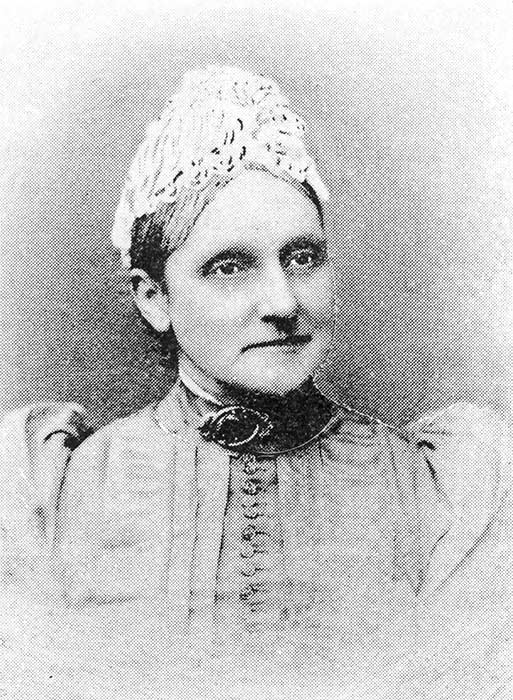
- Born: 8 September 1835; Preston, Somerset, Somerset, England
- Died: 6 June 1905 (aged 69); Dunedin, New Zealand
- Occupation: suffragist

Marion Hatton (née Hanover; 8 September 1835 – 6 June 1905) was a New Zealand suffragist.

== Early life ==
Hatton was born in Preston, Somerset, England on 8 September 1835 to Elizabeth Stenner and Robert Hanover. As a young woman, she was involved with Sunday-school work, and she campaigned for temperance with the Band of Hope. She worked as a milliner. On 7 October 1855 she married Joseph Hatton, an accountant. They went to Amsterdam and founded a lodge for the temperance organisation Good Templars. At some point, the Hattons emigrated to New Zealand and settled in Dunedin.

== Suffrage movement ==
On 12 April 1892, Hatton chaired a meeting in Dunedin in support of women's suffrage. She became one of two presidents and the working leader of the Dunedin Franchise League, which was founded two weeks later. The Franchise League campaigned against the anti-suffrage politician Henry Fish's bid for the mayoralty of Dunedin later in 1892. "Rejoice with us", Hatton wrote, "we have beaten Mr Fish".

Hatton became the principal speaker for the Franchise League, and travelled throughout the southern half of the South Island with Helen Nicol speaking at suffrage meetings and organising petitions requesting the government to enact women's suffrage. The Dunedin Franchise League collected more signatures than any other area. A bill to do so was passed by the Legislative Council on 8 September 1893 – Hatton's birthday. A celebratory meeting was held in the Dunedin City Hall with a "thousand handkerchiefs waving for victory". Hatton next worked to make sure as many women as possible were on the electoral rolls for the general election on 28 November 1893.

During the winter of 1895, Hatton and other members of the League ran soup kitchens for the unemployed.

Hatton continued to work for equality of women with men. She was particularly concerned that women should receive equal pay. In 1896, Hatton suggested that a co-ordinating body be set up for women's societies in New Zealand, and this led to the formation of the National Council of Women. She attended its inaugural conference in Christchurch, on 13 April 1896.

== Later life ==
Hatton suffered from heart disease and her health deteriorated. Her philanthropic work may have contributed to this. She died on 6 June 1905, survived by her husband, five sons, and a daughter.
