= Jessie Williamson =

New Zealand suffragist and welfare worker

Jessie Marguerite Williamson
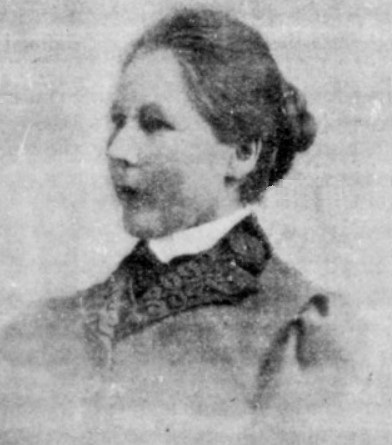
- Jessie Marguerite Williamson (née McAllan), c1900
- Born: Jessie Marguerite McAllan sometime between 1855 and 1857; Dublin, Ireland
- Died: 26 July 1937; Auckland, New Zealand
- Occupation: suffragist

Jessie Marguerite Williamson (née McAllan, c.1855–26 July 1937) was a notable New Zealand suffragist and welfare worker.

== Early life ==
Jessie Williamson was born in Dublin, County Dublin, Ireland somewhere between 1855 and 1857. Williamson married Hugh Bellis Williamson (1850–1926) on 11 December 1875 in Dublin, and a few years later they moved to New Zealand and settled down in Whanganui They had four daughters: Lena, Ann, Mary, and Sheila.

== Activism ==
Whilst in Whanganui, Williamson became a prominent leader of the Wanganui Women's Franchise (later renamed the Wanganui Women's Political League). In 1893 the club's primary goal was organising the process for gaining support for the vote for women, and to rally voters to get out and participate in the national elections. Williamson also lobbied at the national level for women's right to equal pay.

In 1896 Williamson was a founding member of the National Council of Women of New Zealand (NCW NZ), working first as a secretary and then was appointed as the national treasurer in 1898. She also served as national treasurer from 1898.

In 1900, Williamson was appointed to the Patea and Wanganui United Charitable Aid Board, representing the Wanganui Borough Council, becoming the second woman in that district to do so (the first being Frances Stewart). She was featured on the cover of the Women's Christian Temperance Union of New Zealand's White Ribbon in which her work was lauded and that "her enthusiasm, and shrewd common sense, has been invaluable; while her lively sense of the humorous is a constant sense of refreshment."

Her family moved several times, and finally she settled in Auckland where she joined the Civic League, an organisation raising awareness on women's issues and women running for office. Williamson served as vice president of the Auckland branch of the NCW from 1918 to 1919, and then served as vice president of the Civic League in 1922 and from 1926 to 1928.

== Legacy ==
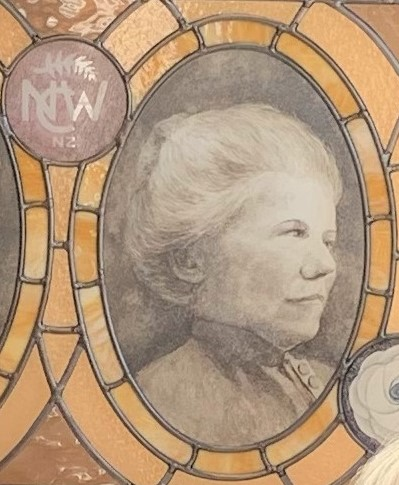
Jessie Marguerite Williamson, suffragist, commemoration window in Whanganui District Council Chamber

In 2022 the Whanganui branch of the NCW NZ sponsored the creation of Williamson's portrait to be added to a series of stained-glass windows decorating the Whanganui District Council Chamber - series called "The Whanganui Story – Ngā Kōrero Hītori o te Hapori."

== Death ==
On 26 July 1937, Jessie Williamson died in her home in Epsom, New Zealand, after a lifetime of advocating for women's rights throughout the nation.
