= Dorothy Page (historian) =

New Zealand historian and academic

Dorothy Pauline Page is a retired New Zealand historian and academic. She specialised in women's history, biography and public history.

Page was appointed as a lecturer in history at the University of Otago in 1969 and was later promoted to associate professor. Page completed a PhD at the university in 1984, with a thesis on disability in nationality of British women (a term referring to the change of nationality of a British woman when she married a foreigner). In 1986 Page and her colleague Barbara Brookes introduced the first university-level women's history paper in New Zealand. She retired from the university in 2000. Page remained active in local history events; she was the president of the Otago Settlers' Association in 2007 and 2008.

In 1993, Page was awarded the New Zealand Suffrage Centennial Medal.

== Publications ==
- Anatomy of a Medical School: A History of Medicine at the University of Otago 1875–2000 (Otago University Press, 2008)
- Communities of Women: Historical Perspectives, co-edited with Barbara Brookes (Otago University Press, 2002)
- The National Council of Women: A Centennial History (Bridget Williams Books, 1996)
