= Ada Wells =

New Zealand suffragette (1863–1933)

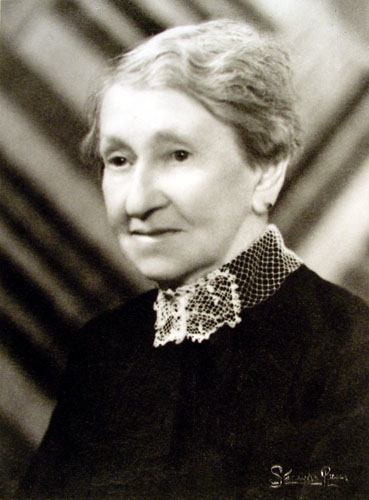
- Ada Wells in early 1930s
- Born: Ada Pike; 29 April 1863; Henley-on-Thames, South Oxfordshire, England
- Died: 22 March 1933 (aged 69); Christchurch, New Zealand
- Education: Canterbury College
- Occupations: Educator, social activist, suffragist
- Spouse: Harry Wells (m. 1884–1918) his death
- Relatives: Rachel McAlpine (great-granddaughter)

Ada Wells (née Pike, 29 April 1863 – 22 March 1933) was an English-born New Zealand feminist and social worker.

== Biography ==
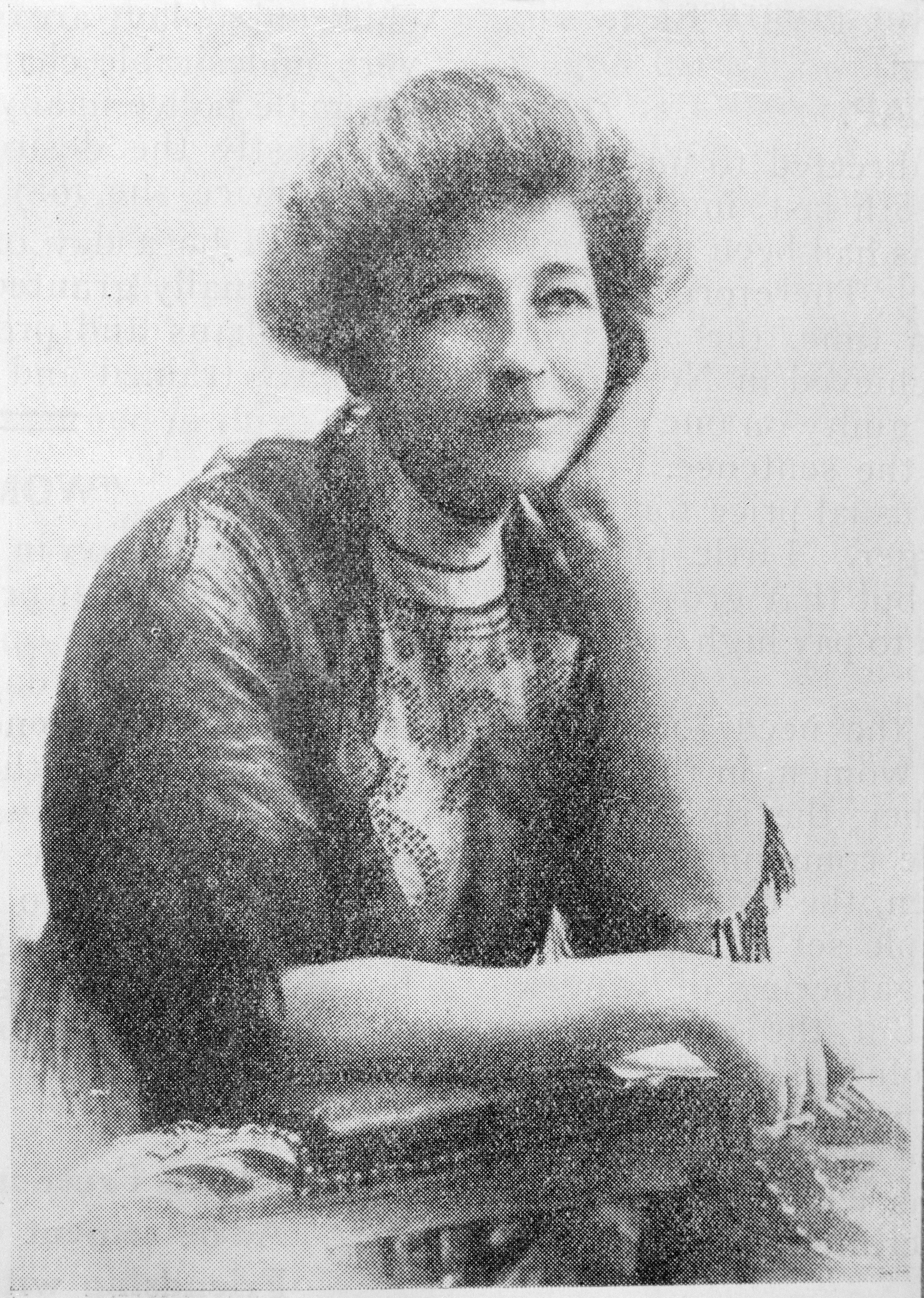
Ada Wells c. 1910

Ada Pike was born near Henley-on-Thames, South Oxfordshire, England. Her parents emigrated to New Zealand with their four girls and one boy in 1873, arriving on the Merope in Lyttelton on 31 October of that year. She attended Avonside School from 1874, and Christchurch West High School in 1876, where she then worked as a pupil-teacher from 1877 to 1881.

Wells was awarded a scholarship to attend Canterbury College in 1881. In 1884, aged 20, she married Harry Wells, the cathedral organist and choirmaster. Twelve years Ada's senior, with a violent temper and fondness for alcohol, he was a poor financial manager. Ada's marital experience – where she was, at times, the family breadwinner – strengthened her belief that women should have economic independence.

Wells was a teacher at St. Albans School which was situated in a poor working class part of Christchurch. With her husband's help, Ada put on concerts in aid of the school prize fund. In 1892, Ada, pregnant, sought two months' leave of absence. The North Canterbury Education Board was inclined to grant this. However, Ada was opposed by the headmaster, James Speight, who wrote a long letter on 'the delinquencies of Mrs. Wells'. Rather than being granted leave of absence, Ada was dismissed.

In the 1880s, working within the Women's Christian Temperance Union New Zealand (WCTU NZ), Ada was active in the women's suffrage movement. While Kate Sheppard was the public face of the WCTU NZ's campaign for the enfranchisement of women, Ada was an organiser. In 1893 New Zealand became the first self-governing country in the world in which all women had the right to vote in parliamentary elections.

In 1892, Ada established the Canterbury Women's Institute with Professor Alexander Bickerton, an organisation similar to the Women's Franchise Leagues in other parts of the country; for many years, she was president. In 1896 when the National Council of Women of New Zealand was formed, she became its first secretary.

From 1899 to 1906, Ada was an elected member of the Ashburton and North Canterbury United Charitable Aid Board. She was associated with the Prison Gate Mission for the rehabilitation of ex-prisoners. A founding member of the National Council of Women in 1896, she was the first secretary.

In 1905 Wells inherited the family house in Merivale, Christchurch after her mother died. From this address she continued practicing massage therapy, also her mother's profession, studied Anthroposophy, and continued her activism.

She had three daughters and a son. Harry Wells died in 1918. Ada died in Christchurch on 22 March 1933 and was buried at the Waimairi Cemetery.

The Ministry for Culture and Heritage now offers an Ada Wells Memorial Prize for Undergraduate Students.

== Activism ==
As a member of the National Peace Council, Ada spoke out strongly against conscription and war, and helped support conscientious objectors during the First World War.

Wells advocated a meatless diet and was a vegetarianism activist. At the 1897 conference of the National Council of Women, Wells promoted an ovo-lacto vegetarian diet. She authored magazine articles supportive of naturopathy and vegetarianism. Wells was an anti-vaccinationist and opposed vivisection.

In 1898, Ada and Margaret Sievwright advocated for the economic independence of women, a continuing theme throughout her life. She also advocated for the repeal of the Contagious Diseases Act (1869), which legislated for the compulsory inspection of women and detention on suspicion of carrying venereal disease. The act was eventually repealed in 1910.

She campaigned for the corollary to women's suffrage, women's right to stand for Parliament. This was ultimately granted in 1919, though no woman was elected until 1933, when Elizabeth McCoombs was voted in to the New Zealand Parliament.

A member of the Labour Party, Ada was, between 1917 and 1919, the first woman member of the Christchurch City Council. She is quoted as saying: "I stand for better housing, for municipal markets, for proper working conditions for all employees, for rest-rooms and play gardens for mothers and children, I shall work for municipal activities in the direction of the uplifting of the people."

In keeping with her educational background, Ada was the City Council representative on the Board of Governors of Christchurch Technical College, where she was the sole woman member.

== Wells in art and literature ==
Wells is represented in a fictional account of her life and those of her daughter, Bim, and fellow suffragist, Kate Sheppard. The book, Farewell Speech (1990) is written by Wells's great granddaughter, Rachel McAlpine. The book was later adapted into an award-winning play by Cathy Downes in 1993.

Wells and her marriage to Harry feature in a 2015 musical, That Bloody Woman, written by Luke Di Somma and Gregory Cooper about the suffragist movement in New Zealand.

== See also ==
- List of suffragists and suffragettes
- Timeline of women's suffrage
- Women's suffrage in New Zealand
