= Ministry for Women =

Government ministry of New Zealand

- Manatū Wāhine (Māori)

Agency overview
- Formed: 1984
- Jurisdiction: New Zealand
- Headquarters: Level 9, IT Qual House, 22 The Terrace, WELLINGTON 6011
- Employees: 28
- Annual budget: Vote Women; Total budget for 2019/20 ▲$6,842,000
- Minister responsible: Nicola Grigg Minister for Women
- Agency executive: Kellie Coombes Tumu Whakarae
- Website: women.govt.nz

The Ministry for Women (Māori: Manatū Wāhine) is the public service department of New Zealand charged with advising the New Zealand Government on policies and issues affecting women. It was formerly called the Ministry for Women's Affairs (MWA), but it was announced that the name would be changed to Ministry for Women in December 2014. The minister in charge of the department is the Minister for Women (previously Minister for Women's Affairs), currently Nicola Grigg.

== History ==
The fight for women's rights started well and truly before the liberation movement, with the suffrage movement between 1892 and 1893. New Zealand became the first country to liberate women with the right to vote; however, the fight did not end there. The woman's liberation movement that took place in the 1960s and 1970s was a fight for equal employment opportunities, equal pay, accessed to education, safe access to abortion, free contraception and more.

During 1966, the formally known 'second wave' of the women's suffrage emerged and by the 1970s many conventions were being held in favour of women rights. This increased interest and popularity to the women's suffrage acknowledging and bringing attention to issues including women's health and violences against women. As a repercussion to this in 1975 the women's electoral lobby was formed to increases women's participation in politics.

Three years later, following the United Nations declaration that 1975 would be 'International Women's Year', the current New Zealand government decided to propose the establishment of the 'committee of women'. By 1981 it had been replaced by the Advisory Committee on Women's Affairs (ACWA) as an attempt to influence women in politics and policy making.

By the early 1980s the labour government decided the women's movement needed a formal voice and representative at the cabinet level. This role was given to the minister of justice as spokesperson. Officially the ministry of women's affairs was established in late 1984 and passed separate legislation in early 1985. The outcome of this legislative change was to achieve a high level of gender equality between power and resources. Furthermore, was attempted to expand choices for women and develop policies in favour of opportunities for women. The ministry was the first policy agency to included a Māori specific unit, to address issues regarding wahine Māori. The 1990s gave women participation in government both public and private, and in 2014 the ministries name was changed to 'ministry for women'. The name was later changed again in 2020 to 'Manatua Wahine Ministry for Women.

As of 2023, the current minister for Manatua Wahine Ministry for Women is Hon Jan Tinetti who is currently pursuing the issue of equal gender representation on public sector boards.

== Main roles ==
The ministry was established from 26 July 1984; the first minister was Ann Hercus. It is the smallest core government agency with a staff of 28. At the time of its establishment, a foundation goal of the ministry was to "work towards its own abolition;" however, it continues to provide dedicated services and functions.

The ministry's main responsibilities are:

- Providing suitable women nominees for appointment to state sector boards and committees
- Policy advice on improving outcomes for women in New Zealand
- Providing support services to the Minister of Women's Affairs
- Managing New Zealand's international obligations in relation to the status of women

== Achievements ==
Since its formation, the ministry has worked with external stakeholders to improve outcomes for New Zealand women. Examples of these achievements include:

- Gaining private sector commitment towards increasing the number of women on private sector boards
- Significantly increasing the number of women on state sector boards
- Conducting ground-breaking research on sexual violence, which influenced the Court of Appeal in revising sentencing guidelines for sexual violation offences
- Contributing to the introduction of Paid Parental Leave and Flexible Work provisions
- Refocusing Out of School Services, including contributing to the establishment of extended services in low decile schools
- Influencing domestic violence legislation
- Contributing to improving the effectiveness of sexuality education in schools.

In 2011, the New Zealand Institute for Economic Research ranked the ministry first out of 22 government departments for the quality of its policy advice and briefings to the Minister.

== Areas of focus ==
The ministry's policy work is focused on three priority areas:

- increasing the economic independence of women
- increasing the number of women in leadership
- increased the safety of women from violence.

These three priorities feed into the Government's objectives of lifting New Zealand's economic performance and building a safer New Zealand.

=== Greater economic independence ===
The ministry's work in the 'greater economic independence' area focuses on "enabling women to make informed choices that lead to better lifetime incomes". Efforts in this area focus on the factors that can support women to more fully access economic opportunities and resources, such as:

- supporting women on low incomes and benefits into sustainable, quality work
- encouraging women into higher paid, less-traditionally female work
- strengthening enablers of women's employment, such as affordable, quality childcare, flexible work and a tax-transfer system that ensures an adequate net return from paid work.

There are two performance indicators to measure the impact of the ministry's work in this area:

- Women's income: the percentage of women in the lowest two income quintiles will reduce from 59 percent
- Women's qualifications: The percentage of industry trainees who are women, including Maori and Pacific women, will increase from 29 percent. The percentage of graduates at bachelor level or higher in information technology and engineering and related fields who are women will increase from the range of 21–23 percent.

=== Women in leadership ===
There is compelling evidence that greater gender diversity in governance correlates with better decision making and organisational performance, providing economic and other benefits. Having more women in leadership roles ensures a wider range of views for key decisions, and brings stronger connections with customers, stakeholders and investors. There is a need for a dual focus on demand for and supply of women board members.

The ministry assists decision makers to achieve greater diversity in governance, in both the public and private sectors, by making the case for change and advising on effective strategies to realise change.

The ministry also assists women to know about the type of governance roles that align with their skills and interests and how to pursue those roles. The ministry provides women candidates for vacancies on state sector boards and, on request, for other entities.

The ministry also operates a Nominations Service, which puts forward appropriate women candidates for a range of governance roles.

=== Safety from violence ===
Intimate partner violence and sexual violence are the most common forms of violence against women in New Zealand, and are of great cost to individuals, their families and the economy. Treasury has estimated that sexual offending costs the New Zealand economy $1.2 billion a year and is by far the most expensive crime per incident. The consequences of this violence can be long-lasting, with adverse effects on health, relationships, children's welfare and education, employment, productivity, earnings, and quality of life.

The ministry works with other government departments on issues of intimate partner and sexual violence, with particular attention to minimising the incidence of revictimisation, and an increasing focus on prevention.

Its recent work has focused on:

- building on a 2009 research project that looked at effective interventions for adult victim/survivors of sexual violence
- monitoring progress and outcomes of policy developments in other countries, to apply lessons relevant to New Zealand

There are two performance indicators to measure the impact of the ministry's work in this area:

- The percentage of women who experience intimate partner violence at some time in their lifetime will decrease from 25 percent.
- The percentage of women who experience sexual violence at some time in their lifetime will decrease from 29 percent.

== Criticism ==
In 2016, ACT Party party leader David Seymour expressed concern over having a Minister for Women. He dismissed "ministers existing purely for a particular type of person", believing that all New Zealanders should be accounted for under all ministers. Seymour expressed concern that there is no Minister for Men, a group that is "higher in suicide statistics, higher in imprisonment rates, higher in mental health statistics and lower in educational attainment". He suggested a Minister for Gender would serve a greater purpose if "demographic ministers" were to continue to exist in New Zealand government. This in turn received backlash, notably from Suzanne Manning, president of the National Council of Women of New Zealand.

== See also ==
- Minister for Women (New Zealand)
