= Emma Packe =

Prominent member of women's suffrage movement in New Zealand

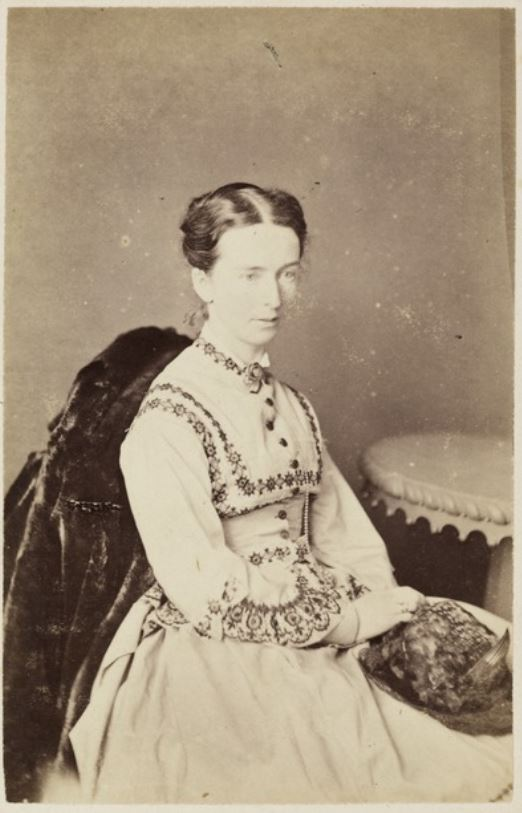
- Born: Emma Eliza de Winton; 20 April 1840; Brecon, Wales
- Died: 11 July 1914 (aged 74); Westbourne Park, Middlesex, England
- Other names: Emma E. Packe
- Known for: temperance activism
- Spouse: Lt. Col. George Packe (1836–1882)
- Parent(s): Emma Eliza and John Jeffreys de Winton

Emma Eliza Packe (née de Winton (20 April 1840 – 11 July 1914) of Christchurch, New Zealand was the founding president of the Christchurch Women's Christian Temperance Union in May 1885 and National President of the Women's Christian Temperance Union New Zealand from 1887 to 1889.

== Early life ==
De Winton was the eldest child of Emma Eliza and John Jeffreys de Winton, a banker and justice of the peace in Brecon, Wales. She was born and baptised on 20 April 1840. According to the Welsh census, her family household expanded quickly with three younger brothers (Parry, Herbert and Charles) and three servants. On 28 July 1861, she married George Packe, the son of Eliza Isham Packe and Colonel Henry Packe (by then deceased) of Twyford Hall in Norfolk. He was, at that time, a Lieutenant of the Royal Welch Fusiliers (1st Battalion). They sailed from Plymouth on the Matoaka for New Zealand on 13 November 1861 and arrived in Lyttelton on 10 February 1862.

== Temperance leadership and philanthropy ==
Mary Greenleaf Clement Leavitt, the first world missionary for the Woman's Christian Temperance Union (WCTU), had travelled to Christchurch from Dunedin where Catherine Fulton led the formation of a WCTU NZ chapter there. Leavitt was travelling with evangelist Richard T. Booth sent to New Zealand from England on behalf of the Blue Ribbon Army. The local newspapers provided an introduction to Leavitt's life and official mission as a representative of the World WCTU and announced her first lecture hosted by the Christchurch Blue Ribbon Committee the evening of 9 May at the YMCA rooms. Leavitt continued with a series of lectures each evening that week in various churches. On Thursday, 14 May, toward the end of the week of her lectures, Leavitt gave "An Address to the Women's Prayer Union" at 3 p.m. in the Rooms of the YMCA. At that meeting, with over forty women attending, Leavitt explained the difference between a WCTU's organisation and other kinds of temperance clubs. At the next evening's event, Emma E. Packe was elected president of the founding chapter of the Christchurch WCTU NZ. Cecilia Wroughton was elected treasurer, and Kate Sheppard was elected secretary of the new local Union. It was decided that the chapter's vice presidents would be "all wives of all ministers of religion who are willing to act as such." They adopted the same WCTU constitution as had already been used in Auckland, Dunedin and Port Chalmers earlier that year, and similarly adopted and circulated a petition to the Legislature against the employment of barmaids.

Later that same month, Packe and Wroughton accompanied Leavitt as she travelled north to speak at the Rangiora Literary Institute Hall. The next day they supported the creation of the new Union chapter in that city. The Union at Christchurch had weekly general meetings with the Executive officers meeting monthly. The founding members of the Executive Committee for the Christchurch Union were:

President: Mrs. Emma E. Packe.
Secretary (Corresponding): Mrs. A. C. Newton, North Belt.
Secretary (Recording): Miss Aldred, Spring field Road.
Treasurer: Mrs. Cecilia Wroughton, 78, Chester-street
Treasurer (Assistant): Mrs. Toneycliffe, Richmond

In addition, the Union hosted an evening meeting once a month dedicated to recruiting "young women engaged in business" to attend. The Prison Gate Mission, led by Mrs. Raffles, offered support for incarcerated women and a halfway home for released prisoners. With only four beds in the Prisongate Brigade Home, they hosted 80 prisoners within the first six months. Mrs. Lodge, the superintendent of Evangelist Work, held 680 prayer meetings that year. Mrs. Isitt printed temperance tracts for circulation in Christchurch, and Mrs. Cunningham wrote an essay on "the Social Evil" which was included. The Temperance Booth at the Canterbury Agricultural and Pastoral Association Show offered literature, hot tea and water in its first year (and a hot lunch for the next forty years). The Union gathered 4,800 signatures on the anti-barmaid petition. By the end of the year, the Union could count 105 working members along with nine "honorary" (i.e., paying male subscribers) members.

For the first time in Christchurch, New Zealand, a woman sat at the head of the platform for a mixed-gender public meeting when Packe, on behalf of the local WCTU chapter, welcomed the gospel temperance orator Matthew Burnett. Typically, the temperance societies expected women to stay in the background, preparing and serving tea. It must have felt extraordinary to see the male leaders of other temperance groups then follow her in presenting on stage: "Mr. Cather, Sons of Temperance; Mr. Shaw, Rechabites; Mr. J.T. Smith in lieu of J.A. Efford, Good Templars; F.W. Isitt, Blue Ribbon Army."

Anne Ward, Provisional President of WCTU NZ called the first national convention. It was held 23–24 February 1886 in Wellington. Packe read a paper on unfermented wine, a topic that was under great scrutiny by temperance leaders globally. The debate centred on whether the wine served by Jesus to his disciples was "fruit of the vine" (i.e., grape juice) or fermented. Her exposition was greeted positively since she was elected first national superintendent of this department.

== Suffrage leadership ==
At the second WCTU NZ convention in Christchurch, New Zealand in February 1887, Packe was elected president of WCTU NZ, succeeding Anne Ward, the founding president. Kate Sheppard was appointed as Superintendent of the Franchise Department.

Under Packe's leadership, petitions for woman suffrage were organised by the WCTU NZ chapters with 779 signatures and these were presented to the New Zealand Legislative Council. The Clerk of the House of Representatives received on 2 July 1888 the powerful words crafted by this nascent women's organisation. The petition is excerpted below:

We the undersigned women of New Zealand respectfully pray that your Honourable House will at the earliest possible moment introduce and pass into law a measure for granting the Franchise to the women of this colony. We would remind you that a similar measure introduced into the late parliament passed its second reading in your House by a substantial majority and doubltess would have been successfully carried through its remaining stages but for the intervention of matters that rendered an appeal to the Country necessary. We urge that in view of the large measures measures of social and domestic legislation that must soon engage the attention of Parliament, it is absolutely necessary in order that a wise and beneficent determination of these great questions may be arrived at that the Women of New Zealand may be afforded a constitutional success of making known their views on all public questions in which their interests are vitally affected. As in duty bound your petitioners humbly pray that your Honourable House will without delay take such steps to grant them relief as in your opinion the circumstances set forth require.

Packe gathered up local Unions that had begun to wither away due to the difficulties associated with the unusual aspect of women-only leadership for a political cause. For example, she attended a Blue Ribbon Army meeting in Oamaru, spoke on behalf of the WCTU NZ and called the vote to reorganize their chapter.

In 1889 Packe was living in Upper Riccarton, Christchurch when she presided over the Fourth Annual WCTU NZ Convention in Wellington; she was also still serving as the Superintendent for Unfermented Wine. The meeting convened on 26 February and ended on 5 March 1889, featuring Mrs. William Jones, a representative from the British Women's Temperance Association. The Wellington chapter hosted a reception at the Ladies' Christian Association Rooms on Manners Street. That year, a Peace and Arbitration department was added to the list of National Departments of Work and Catherine Fulton named national superintendent. Packe announced she sent a WCTU NZ banner to the 1889 World's Fair in Paris and paid the Woman's Temperance Building Association for a NZ brick to be added to the "Women's Temple," a skyscraper being built in Chicago for the Woman's Christian Temperance Union. On 28 February, Packe chaired the Tea and Public Meeting hosted by Wellington Union in Smart's Central Arcade; Packe introduced Mr. Field of Nelson who described his trip to England and the temperance campaign there. She also presided over a lecture on Friday 1 March at the Smart's Central Arcade: "Love, Courtship and Marriage" for young women over fourteen years of age – married women and mothers also invited. Packe's report that year on her departmental work on Unfermented Wine featured her effort to lobby the Synod of Anglican Church but she was told that "it would need several corrections before it could be received by the Synod."

Packe continued to expand the regional impact of the WCTU NZ. In 1889 she worked with activists at Nelson and helped personally at their Temperance tent on the Public Sports' Ground on New Year's Day. In 1890 on 30 January, Packe organised the Kaiapoi WCTU with Mrs. Richard Evans elected president. This town was crucial to communication with inland rural communities and trading routes up the Waimakariri River. The Union started with eighteen members and increased by the end of the year to seventy-three active members and twenty-six "honorary" (i.e., dues-paying males who signed the total abstinence pledge). They offered a refreshment booth at the A&P Show and began running "coffee rooms," shops where non-alcoholic drinks were offered at a low cost.

In her President's Address at the 5th Annual Convention in Dunedin in February 1890, she announced she and Mrs. George Clark had sent 4004 names to the US to add to the Polyglot Petition. She also reported that she had written 237 letters on national business, and sent 18 telegrams. Catherine Fulton was elected national President for 1890–91, and Packe continued still as Superintendent of Unfermented Wine. In 1892 she switched to the national superintendent for Narcotics. At that national convention in Auckland, on 22 March 1892, Packe proposed an amendment to the WCTU NZ Constitution that "no member shall be eligible for election who does not accept the Bible doctrine of the Atonement through Christ Jesus." This measure lost however since members thought it unwise to put theological doctrine into the Union's Constitution.

Not much is known about Packe's leadership style, however there were some who remembered her in later years. "Personal recollections are of the rather austere personality which often accompanied earnestness and good works." Her influence was clear since her persistence on finding a way to offer non-alcoholic refreshments at the Christchurch A&P Show – and the heavy rent charged by the A&P Association which did not deter her – was remembered in 1908: "Although 17,000 persons attended the Show, not one intoxicated person was seen."

== Immigration to England and death ==
A widow since 1882, Emma E. Packe decided finally to emigrate to England. On 30 May 1894, Packe arrived in London on the Aorangi from Lyttelton.

Emma Eliza Packe at the age of 74 died on 11 July 1914 at her home at 72 Cornwall Road, Westbourne Park, in Middlesex.

== See also ==
- Women's Christian Temperance Union New Zealand

== Bibliography ==
- Bunkle, Phillida (1980). "The Origins of the Women's Movement in New Zealand: The Women's Christian Temperance Union 1885–1895". In Bunkle, Phillida; Hughes, Beryl (eds.). Women in New Zealand Society. Sydney, AUS: George Allen & Unwin. pp. 52–76.
- Minutes of the New Zealand Women's Christian Temperance Union, 'For God, and Home, and Humanity' at the First Annual Meeting, Held in Wellington, 23rd February, 1886 (New Zealand Electronic Text Collection, Victoria University of Wellington, NZ ed.). Wellington, NZ: Lyon & Blair, Printers. 1886.
- Peryman, Mrs. N. (1930). "VIII: Woman and the Movement". In Murray, J. Malton; Cocker, Rev. J. (eds.). Temperance and Prohibition in New Zealand (New Zealand Electronic Texts Collection, Victoria University of Wellington ed.). London, England: The Epworth Press.
- Wood, Jeanne (1986). A Challenge Not a Truce: a history of the New Zealand Women's Christian Temperance Union, 1885–1985. Nelson, NZ: The Union.
