= Anne Ward (suffragist) =

Prominent member of women's temperance movement in New Zealand

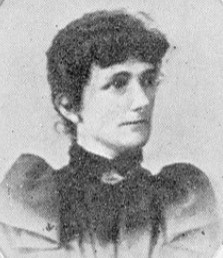
- Born: Anne Titboald; December 1825; Topsham, Devon, England
- Died: 31 May 1896 (aged 70); Christchurch, New Zealand
- Resting place: Burwood Anglican Cemetery, Christchurch
- Other names: Annie Ward
- Known for: Women's Christian Temperance Union New Zealand and Women's suffrage
- Spouse: Dudley Ward (judge)
- Parent(s): Thomas and Jane Tidboald (also spelled Tidbald)

Anne Ward (née Titboald, c. 1825 – 31 May 1896) was the first national president of the Women's Christian Temperance Union New Zealand from 1885 to 1887, and a prominent member of the women's suffrage movement in New Zealand.

== Early life and immigration to New Zealand ==
Anne Titboald was the daughter of Thomas and Jane Tidboald (also spelled Tidbald) of Topsham, Devon, near Exeter in England. Her christening is listed in the Topsham Parish church records on 31 December 1825. She is listed as being 15 in the 1841 Census for Exeter, with her father's occupation as tailor; and, they lived with her two sisters at that time: Elizabeth (age 10) and Emma (age 8). Her mother Jane was not counted in the 1841 census. She might have also had two other older siblings who would have been gone from the household by 1841: Harriet (baptised on 14 January 1824) and Mary Jane (baptised on 4 June 1822).

On 26 January 1850, she married a barrister-in-training Dudley Ward at All Saints Church in the parish of Rotherhithe, Surrey. Her sister Elizabeth and her father are both listed on the marriage certificate. After his admission to the bar, the Wards set out for New Zealand, arriving on 29 September 1854 in Wellington on the Cordelia. The Wards became involved in civic affairs soon thereafter.

== Reform work ==
=== Wellington ===
As a member of the Primitive Methodist church, she was expected to take an active role in social outreach along with religious conversion efforts. As part of a fundraising effort to support the women and children of soldiers away fighting in the Crimean War, a Ladies Charity Bazaar was held in the Athenaeum on 1 May 1855, and Mrs. Ward was listed as a stall holder.

A year later, Dudley Ward became a Member of the House of Representatives in New Zealand's second parliament, serving for the Wellington Country electorate. They lived in a leased house in Thorndon Flat but within three years they had bought a house in Wellington Terrace. She grew ill. C.W. Richmond dined with the Wards in September 1857 and soon afterward wrote to his wife: "Mrs. Ward has been very pretty but looks exhausted by illness." She was still sick months later: Judge Ward wrote to his colleague Sir John Hall in March 1858 to explain why he cannot come to Auckland, saying he was busy with district court dates but also "partly on account of Mrs. Ward's state of health, which is so precarious that I dare not leave the Province for any long period, which of course renders her completely unable to travel." She might have had diabetes which could cause the early onset of glomerulonephritis (GN), at the time called Bright's Disease and which eventually caused her death.

In 1860 she got the mumps from her husband. That same year Judge Ward's father, Sir Henry George Ward GCMG died, and they travelled to England, not returning until 1863. They then bought a house on a corner lot of Molesworth and Hawkestone Streets (very near the Parliament buildings today in Wellington). Judge Ward was appointed District Judge of a large circuit and was away often. They kept the house in Wellington when in 1868 they moved to Dunedin when Judge Ward was appointed Acting Judge of the Supreme Court.

When the Wards left Wellington in 1868, a local newspaper, The Independent, wrote: "Mrs. Ward's benevolence has been of the most active kind, and many a poor family will miss her when she is gone..." She might have been the "Mrs. Ward" who collected a "large sum" for a Magdalen Refuge in 1867–1868. This fundraising was part of the work by the Wellington Benevolent Society which had been active since 1867. This group typically offered funds or services for indigent immigrants, the elderly, ill or impoverished who had no family to take care of them. Ward might have also been doing this work as part of her Primitive Methodist church outreach efforts. Besides organising soup kitchens or working with new immigrants, evangelist church work often included finding homes for single women seeking a way to earn a living other than prostitution.

The Wards lived in Dunedin for only two years before moving to Hokitika for a year in 1870, then on the eastern coast of the South Island, living in Timaru where they lived in a large mansion 'Eversley' on Belfield Hill on North Street. The economic problems of the 1880s impacts the Judge's health in the early part of the decade, and he took Anne with him to spend a year at the Hot Springs at Waiwera, north of Auckland. By this point, the Judge had begun his love affair with the writer Frances Ellen "Thorpe" Talbot (1850–1923) and had bought a house for her in Dunedin.

=== Christchurch ===
Sometime around 1884, the Wards moved to Burwood, a small rural community to the northeast of Christchurch, and according to the local gossip handed down to a local historian, they scarcely spoke to each other. This did not stop her from taking a role in civic affairs.

The 1881 Licensing Act of New Zealand had made more consistent the local licensing committees and outlawed dancing girls in places where liquor was sold. In April 1885, Anne Ward led a women's deputation – representing all the temperance societies of Christchurch – with the Rev R. Taylor to Sir Julius Vogel, Member of Parliament representing Christchurch North. They came to lobby Vogel to support women's suffrage in the debates over the local option – since "women were, in numberless instances, the greatest sufferers from the effects of the drink traffic..." and they hoped that Sir Julius Vogel would bring before Parliament that all married women might vote upon every question under the Licensing Act. She hoped also for a bill to do away with barmaids. "She had lived in hotels, and had seen the evils of the barmaid system."

== Leadership in New Zealand Women's Christian Temperance Union ==
By the time Anne Ward's deputation had talked with Julius Vogel, the temperance lectures by the American Woman's Christian Temperance Union (WCTU) world missionary Mary Greenleaf Clement Leavitt had been well received in many towns in New Zealand. Leavitt reached Christchurch in May, giving her first lecture at the Theatre Royal on the 10th. Leavitt then spoke at the St. John's Church Temperance Society's Annual Meeting on the 11th, and on the 13th she held a meeting for ladies only at the YMCA rooms. It is likely that at one of these meetings, Leavitt met and became close with Anne Ward.

Leavitt left New Zealand having created seven local chapters affiliated with the WCTU (as well as reorganising the original club in Invercargill) and gathered over 4000 signatures for the Polyglot Petition. Anne Ward took on the role of Provisional President and between September 1885 and January 1886 Ward travelled through the country delivering lectures on temperance and the work of the WCTU. Ward established seven more branch unions by the end of January 1886:

- 3 September 1885 – Wellington
- 16 September – Nelson
- 5 October 1885 – Wanganui
- 27 October 1885 – New Plymouth
- 29 October 1885 – Hawera
- 31 October 1885 – Patea
- January 1886 – Ashburton

=== First National Convention of WCTU New Zealand ===
Ward organised the first national Women's Christian Temperance Union New Zealand meeting. The convention was held in Wellington in the Congregational Church, Woodward Street on 23 February 1886. Representatives included "Mrs. A. Dudley Ward, Provisional President, Christchurch; Mrs. A. Sinclair, Auckland; Mrs. F. Troy, Napier; Miss Sorley, Wanganui; Mrs. R. Hunter, Wellington; Mrs. J. Plimmer, Wellington; Mrs. C. A. Baker, Wellington; Mrs. Nightingale, Nelson; Mrs. E. E. Packe, Christchurch; Mrs. G. Clark, Christchurch; Mrs. Wroughton, Christchurch; Mrs. Rouse, Rangiora; Mrs. C. Fulton, Dunedin." A telegram was read from the Oamaru Union, asking that a proxy be appointed to represent their Union.

The following officers for the coming year were elected by ballot: "Mrs. A. Dudley Ward, President; Miss Susan Brett, Corresponding Secretary; Mrs. Fanny Troy, Recording Secretary; Mrs. C. A. Baker, Treasurer. Following members were elected as Superintendents of Departments : Mrs. A. Dudley Ward, Evangelistic Work; Mrs. G. Clark, Legislation and Petitions [Franchise]; Mrs. Hinton, Social Purity; Mrs. May, Hygiene; Mrs. H. Snow, Influencing the Press; Mrs. E. E. Packe, Unfermented Wine; Mrs. C. Fulton, Juvenile Work; Mrs. J. Plimmer, Gaol Work; Miss Sorley, Young Women's Work; Mrs. Brame, Inebriate Home Work; Mrs. Paterson, Work among Young Women." Mrs. Wright of Wellington was appointed delegate to the New Zealand Temperance Alliance. An executive committee meeting at Ward's private residence at Molesworth Street on 26 February 1886. "Very grateful reference was made to Mrs. Mary Clement Leavett, as the founder of the Women's Christian Temperance Union in New Zealand, and testimony was given of her untiring labour of love in this Colony, which is already yielding and abundant harvest."

The 1886 Minutes also reported that Anne Ward spoke at a meeting open to the public at St. John's Church Schoolroom on 24 February. The meeting was chaired by Mr. Ebenezer Baker, and besides Anne Ward, Mrs. Fulton, Mrs. Wroughton, and former premier and Member of Parliament Sir William Fox was seated on the platform. The Minutes provide excerpts from Ward's speech that night:

"Their [that of the WCTU NZ] great aim was to put down the drink, and put it out of the land altogether—(applause)—here a little, and there a little, till it disappeared altogether. When Mrs. Leavitt came here eight months ago, she organised Unions in Auckland, Napier, Christchurch, Dunedin, Invercargill, and other places. She endeavoured to organise a Union in Wellington, but for some reason or other she did not succeed, and was very disheartened in consequence. At her request, she (Mrs. Ward) accepted the Presidency of the Unions; and a few months afterwards she came to Wellington, and succeeded very well."

According to the newspaper reporter, the audience of about 100 people heard Ward's "evangelistic address." It also included Ward's announcement that the Blue Ribbon Hall in Wellington was kept open every night 7:30-10 p.m. where drunkards could be brought and converted. She described how one night three drunken men were brought in one night were converted and began working with the Salvation Army in Wellington. All in all, there were fifteen WCTU NZ chapters reported with an approximated membership total of 700.

=== Second National Convention of WCTU New Zealand ===
The second national convention of the WCTU NZ was held in Christchurch on 23 February 1887, with Anne Ward in the chair. Ward led an opening prayer and then gave a speech focusing on the Biblical verse, Phil. iii, 14: "I press toward the mark for the prize of the high calling of God in Christ Jesus." Mrs. Emma Packe of Christchurch was elected president for the ensueing year. Ward gave a report on her work running cooking classes in Christchurch, and that butchers had supplied meat for soup for the poor. The WCTU NZ had organised that year two petitions for women's suffrage signed by 350 women which were presented to House of Representatives; and, they reported out that Sir Julius Vogel introduced a women's suffrage bill which would also give them the right to sit in Parliament but it was withdrawn at the committee stage.

=== Third National Convention of WCTU New Zealand ===
At the third national WCTU convention in Dunedin on 22 February 1888, the minutes reported that Anne Ward had established a Free Kindergarten in Auckland which provided dinner and had a creche for infants of working mothers. The school was not supported by the Auckland Board of Education, but relied on private contributions to support the renovating of the building (the City Council had donated the use of the former Free Public Library on High Street), providing care, medical checks and feeding of nearly 1000 children under five years of age from June 1887 to 1899 after Anne Ward's death.

Judge Ward was appointed Acting Judge in the Supreme Court in Auckland and Invercargill in the spring of 1887, so they moved to Auckland where she immediately began participating in temperance and church activities. However, she was listed in the WCTU report as national Superintendent of Kindergartens with the address of Park Terrace, Christchurch. She resigned from this superintendency in 1889.

=== Fourth National Convention of WCTU New Zealand ===
During the 1889 convention of the WCTU NZ, President Catherine Fulton referred to Anne Ward living in Auckland. Just a few weeks prior, Judge Ward had resigned as the Acting Supreme Court Judge since he had not been appointed the permanent appointment. He and his wife moved back to Christchurch where they lived at 98 Park Terrace during the 1890s.

At a WCTU meeting in a town 20 kilometres north of Christchurch, Kate Sheppard spoke on the franchise in the Kaiapoi Wesleyan Schoolroom on 1 October 1890. Anne Ward was then appointed Superintendent of Franchise at Kaiapoi, "and it was resolved that the candidates for the parliamentary elections be asked to express their views on women's franchise."

=== Petitions for Woman Suffrage 1891, 1892, 1893 ===
In 1891, the WCTU NZ under the leadership of Annie Jane Schnackenberg sent up to the House of Representatives eight petitions for woman suffrage signed by more than 9000 women. Sir John Hall introduced a bill which received majority support but was narrowly defeated in Legislative Council. Anna Stout started up the first of the Women's Franchise Leagues in Dunedin in 1892, and women activists in several other cities (e.g., Amey Daldy in Auckland) followed soon thereafter. Anne Ward signed the WCTU NZ franchise petition in 1892 as "Annie Ward, Kaiapoi" (sheet 198), and then again in 1893 when thirteen petitions signed by nearly 32,000 women were presented to the House of Representatives. This time, the Electoral Bill introduced by Richard Seddon passed the Legislative Council and was consented to by the Governor on 19 September 1893. This act offered all adult women citizens (except inmates of prisons and asylums) the right to vote in the general election held in November (for whites) and December (for Maori).

=== The vote ===
The Electoral Roll for New Zealand in 1896 shows "Ann Ward" living in Kaiapoi, Canterbury, and whose occupation was "domestic duties." Meanwhile, her husband is showing on the 1896 Electoral Roll for Christchurch, living at 98 Park Terrace and working as a judge in the District Court.

== Ill health and death ==
Anne Ward died at her husband's home, 98 Park Terrace, in Christchurch on 31 May 1896. He was not present since he was in Dunedin and had to go by express train to get there. She was survived by her husband until 1913. Dr. W.H. Ovenden recorded her death as "Bright's Disease." Sometimes also called nephritis, Bright's Disease is a kidney disease that, if not immediately treated with antibiotics (not available in Ward's time), leads to kidney failure and death. Her funeral was managed by Jas. Lamb & Son and held on 3 June at 2 p.m. at the Burwood Anglican Cemetery. The Lyttelton Times offered a short obituary:

The many friends of Mrs. C.D.R. Ward, wife of his Honor Judge Ward, will regret to hear of her demise, which took place at her residence on Sunday. The deceased lady was well known for her kindly disposition, and for the interest she took in the welfare of the poor and in religious matters.

She was buried in what is now called the All Saints Church Cemetery, and her gravestone has the words: 'For the taken, God be praised. For the left, God be merciful'. When Judge Ward died in Dunedin in 1913, his second wife Frances "Thorpe" Ward sent his body to be buried next to Anne with the following inscription on the gravestone: 'After long years of trial and sorrow cometh Charles Dudley Robert Ward to lay his weary heart beside her whom he held dearest of all'. The Wards had no children.

== See also ==
- Mary Greenleaf Clement Leavitt
- Temperance movement in New Zealand
- Dudley Ward (judge)
- Women's Christian Temperance Union New Zealand
- Gender equality in New Zealand
- List of New Zealand suffragists
- Timeline of women's suffrage

== Resources ==
- Adams, Geoff (2011). Judge Ward: An 'infamous' New Zealand colonist and his two celebrity wives. Dunedin, NZ: Geoff Adams.
- Bunkle, Phillida (1980). "The Origins of the Women's Movement in New Zealand: The Women's Christian Temperance Union 1885–1895". In Bunkle, Phillida; Hughes, Beryl (eds.). Women in New Zealand Society. Sydney, AUS: George Allen & Unwin. pp. 52–76.
- Minutes of the New Zealand Women's Christian Temperance Union, 'For God, and Home, and Humanity' at the First Annual Meeting, Held in Wellington, 23rd February, 1886 (New Zealand Electronic Text Collection, Victoria University of Wellington, NZ ed.). Wellington, NZ: Lyon & Blair, Printers. 1886.
- Peryman, Mrs. N. (1930). "VIII: Woman and the Movement". In Murray, J. Malton; Cocker, Rev. J. (eds.). Temperance and Prohibition in New Zealand (New Zealand Electronic Texts Collection, Victoria University of Wellington ed.). London, England: The Epworth Press.
- Wood, Jeanne (1986). A Challenge Not a Truce: a history of the New Zealand Women's Christian Temperance Union, 1885–1985. Nelson, NZ: The Union.
