= Katharine Bushnell =

American physician and missionary

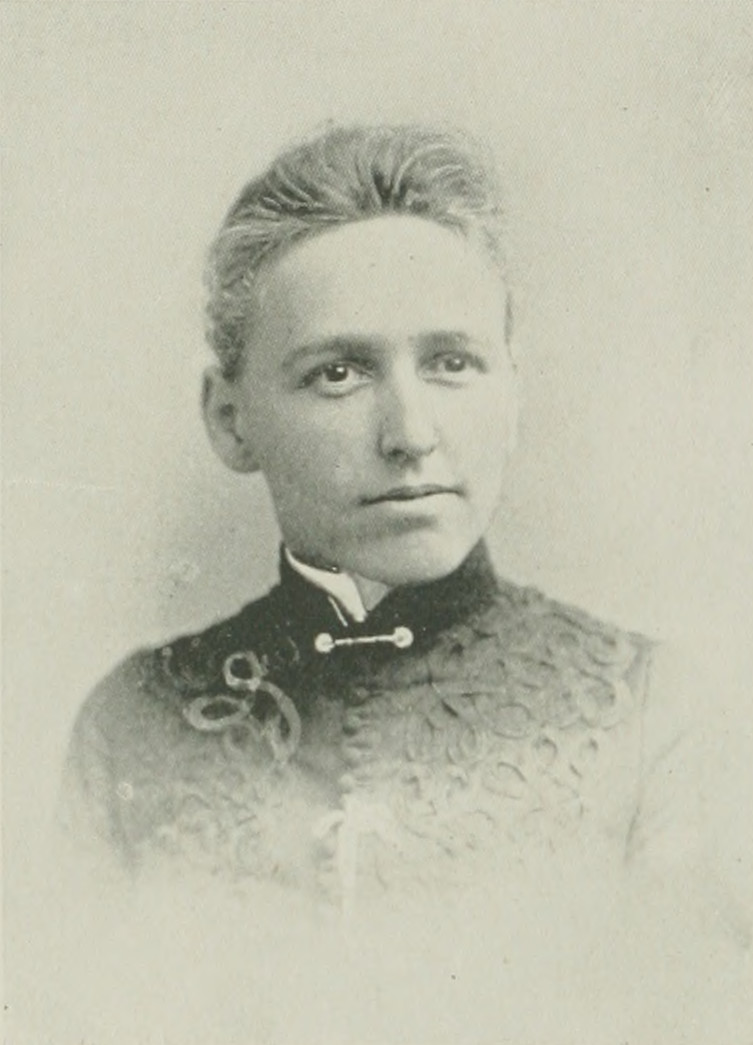
- "A Woman of the Century"
- Born: Sophia Caroline Bushnell; February 5, 1855; Evanston, Illinois, U.S.
- Died: January 26, 1946 (aged 90)
- Other names: Kate Bushnell
- Occupations: medical doctor, Christian writer, Bible scholar, social activist, and forerunner of feminist theology
- Notable work: God's Word to Women

Katharine Bushnell (born Sophia Caroline Bushnell; February 5, 1855, in Evanston, Illinois – January 26, 1946) was a medical doctor, Christian writer, Bible scholar, social activist, and forerunner of feminist theology. Her lifelong quest was for biblical affirmation of the integrity and equality of women, and she published God's Word to Women as a correction of mistranslation and misinterpretation of the Bible. As a missionary and a doctor, Bushnell worked to reform conditions of human degradation in North America, Europe, and Asia. She was recognized as a forceful and even charismatic speaker.

== Early life and education ==
Born February 5, 1856, in Evanston, Illinois, or “the great Methodist mecca of the northwest,” Bushnell's roots in Christianity were well established from the beginning. She grew up in the midst of a religious transition; Methodists in her community were striving to be faithful in every area of their lives while simultaneously craving popular success. With this transition came a shift in focus from the individual to the community as a whole, a change in philosophy which ultimately affected Bushnell's life path.

Bushnell showed the desire to further her education from an early age and attended Women's Northwestern College—now known as Northwestern University—from 1873–1874. Here, she studied under Dean Frances Willard, who inspired Bushnell to pursue a career in social justice. After Northwestern, Bushnell found another mentor in Dr. James Stewart Jewell. The catalyst behind her interest in medicine, Dr. Jewell convinced Bushnell to study medicine at Chicago Women's Medical College, where she specialized in nerve disorders. A driven and intelligent student, she graduated three years ahead of her peers. After obtaining her undergraduate and graduate degrees, Bushnell initially planned on entering postgraduate study but was persuaded by her home church to go to China as a medical missionary in 1879.

== Early career ==
=== China ===
Bushnell served as a medical doctor in Jiujiang, China from 1879 to 1882. Upon arrival, her original plan was to postpone setting up her practice and to get her affairs in order first and learn the native tongue. However, she was quickly overwhelmed with visitors seeking medical attention and, finding that she could not refuse their entreaties, treated hundreds of patients. In response to her friend's thriving practice, Dr. Ella Gilchrist came out to China to assist Bushnell, but the hot summers proved to be intolerable. In 1882, both women fell ill and soon after they were forced to return home.

Quite discouraged by this mission cut short, Bushnell left feeling that "her whole life had been a failure." Yet it was in China that she first became inspired to study Biblical translations. Brushing aside Chinese traditional medicines, Bushnell nevertheless examined Chinese culture more closely than missionaries who had gone before her. She noticed with indignation that the Chinese Bible changed Paul's fellows from women to men, and after that vowed to devote a portion of her life solely to "a meticulous examination of male bias that had corrupted the English text." While it is not confirmed, many sources claim that Bushnell established a pediatric hospital sponsored by the Woman's Mission Board of the Methodist Episcopal Church.

=== America ===
==== Women's Christian Temperance Union ====
Upon Bushnell and Gilchrist's return from China, both women were looking for a cause that they could stand behind. After disappointment with their recently established American medical practice, the pair joined the Women's Christian Temperance Union, or the WCTU. Bushnell returned to her former mentor Willard and became the National Evangelist of the Department of Social Purity. "The largest women's organization of its time," the WCTU championed the causes of families and wives and campaigned to outlaw alcohol, believed to be the root of evil. This reform movement coexisted with the social purity movement, which sought to level the playing field of men and women by raising men's moral standards rather than lowering women's. Bushnell authored The Woman Condemned, a booklet in which she claimed that “the myth of female virtue only exacerbated the hostile legal environment;" rather than protecting women, the feminization of virtue harmed them. In her work, she accused men who called themselves godly yet did not hold themselves to biblical standards of behavior.

==== Wisconsin ====
She attracted the most attention for her Wisconsin Crusade in 1888 against the "white slave trade." Bushnell ignored regional authorities who insisted that it was nonexistent and investigated herself, drawing the conclusion that prostitution in Wisconsin was exploitative and forced. After she succeeded in exposing the prostitution system as unjust, many attempts were made to slander her and take her words out of context, defaming her for creating "cruel lies." In response, Bushnell ordered all of her followers to believe only what she herself published. In 1887, Wisconsin passed Senate Bill 46, affectionately termed the “Kate Bushnell Bill” by her supporters. This piece of legislature made it a felony to abduct unmarried women for the purpose of prostitution and even contained provisions within the bill for mentally disabled women in order to ensure the safety of all women.

== Global mission work ==
Frustrated by her newfound notoriety and convinced that her status as somewhat of a celebrity distracted people from reform, Bushnell became a global missionary. For guidance, she wrote to Josephine Butler, a more experienced reformer than herself. Butler encouraged her to go to India, and in 1891 Bushnell brought her friend Elizabeth Andrew along with her. Unlike Bushnell, Andrew “struggled to shed her prejudice against ‘fallen women’” and for a time had difficulty in interacting with prostitutes the pair encountered.

=== India ===
From 1891-1893, the two conducted the investigations into prostitution within British camps in the colonies. At the time of Bushnell and Andrew’s visit in the early 1890s, there were around 100 military cantonments in India under the control and ownership of Great Britain. With India having the greatest British military presence at about 1000 soldiers per regiment, leaders became worried about the potential outburst of the soldiers due to the lack of a sexual outlet. When the rate of venereal diseases continued to rise alarmingly among the men stationed in India, the British government realized that it was ineffective to merely turn the other way when military men consorted with prostitutes, especially when they were paying the soldiers and covering the costs of their consistent transfers and travel expenses. Thus, the Contagious Diseases Acts were instituted in 1864. Women suspected of being prostitutes or carrying venereal diseases could be arrested and sent to lock hospitals to suffer a series of traumatic experiences described by Bushnell and Andrews as follows:

To these Lock Hospitals the women were obliged to go periodically (generally once a week for an indecent examination, to see whether every part of the body was free from any trace of diseases likely to spread from them to the soldiers, as the result of immoral relations. The compulsory examination is in itself a surgical rape. When a woman was found diseased, she was detained in the hospital until cured; when found healthy she was given a ticket of license to practise fornication and was returned to the chakla for that purpose.

— Katharine Bushnell, The Queen's Daughters in India

The concern was with the potential contamination of British troops rather than the potential spread of foreign diseases among the native population, a point which Bushnell and Andrews emphasize. The pair published The Queen’s Daughters in India, a comprehensive account of their travels throughout India, in 1899. The inspiration for the title came from the missionaries' belief that “the Queen herself must not approve of the measures, ‘for she has daughters of her own; and she cares for her daughters in India also.'" The report consists of the two reformers' descriptions of the harrowing events which took place and their seemingly miraculous entrance into the cantonments. Since the commanding officer of a cantonment has the authority to remove anyone from the garrison at any time for any reason, the women had to step carefully and be sure not to raise suspicion. Furthermore, while they never explicitly lied about their intentions in visiting, they also never explicitly stated their purpose, allowing the officers and the women in charge of running the brothels—the mahaldarnis—to assume that they were there for an evangelical or medical purpose rather than investigative. The women's efforts led to a reprimand for Lord Roberts, the Commander-in-Chief, India.

=== Australia and New Zealand ===
In early October 1892, Andrew and Bushnell travelled from Queensland, Australia to New Zealand. They first spoke in Auckland, giving an overview of the U.S. WCTU history and emphasising the concepts of temperance and social purity. Beginning on October 25, they spoke for several weeks in churches on behalf of the World WCTU, and allowed for the WCTU NZ president, Annie Jane Schnackenberg, to invite the attendees to become members of a local Union as they worked on various projects, including the right for women to vote in national elections. In full agreement with the Auckland WCTU's efforts to push for the repeal of the 1869 Contagious Diseases Act, Dr. Bushnell "denounced the mocking conventionality of society which brands women and exculpates men." Together they reinforced the work the WCTU NZ was doing in pushing for women's right to vote - a victory won in 1893.

== Books ==
They coauthored two books about their experiences, The Queen's Daughters in India and Heathen Slaves and Christian Rulers. The British government subsequently commissioned her to look into the opium trade between India and China.

== God's Word to Women ==
Throughout the nineteenth century, women struggled with "oppressive interpretations of the Bible that deprived them of their power and dignity." Bushnell has been called the most prominent voice declaring the Bible as liberating of women.

Her classic book, God's Word to Women, was first published in book form in 1921. At the time she was 65 years old. God's Word to Women began as a correspondence course in 1908. In 1916, the loose single sheets were bound into two paper-covered volumes, which evolved into the cloth-bound 1921 edition. The book created a stir in America and elsewhere. It did not have mass appeal when first published because of its scholarly content and the few scholars interested in the topic. It relies on translation of ancient Hebrew and Koine Greek and ancient Hebrew culture. However, the book is now valued highly by Christian egalitarian scholars. It is now in public domain and is available online both electronically and in print.

It has been termed a groundbreaking study of what the Bible really says about women. The book is a culmination of her life's work. It was compiled from a correspondence course of the same name. In it, she works through every biblical portion interpreted to mean that women are inferior to men. This included the topics of women not being allowed to preach, required subordination to their husbands, polygamy, and head coverings. She wrote that male-biased mistranslations of the Bible, instead of "hastening the coming of the day of God, are hindering the preparation for that coming."

Supposing women only had translated the Bible, from age to age, is there a likelihood that men would have rested content with the outcome? Therefore, our brothers have no good reason to complain if, while conceding that men have done the best they could alone, we assert that they did not do the best that could have been done. The work would have been of a much higher order had they first helped women to learn the sacred languages (instead of putting obstacles in their way), and then, have given them a place by their side on translations committees.

— Katharine Bushnell, God's Word to Women

The scriptural status of women continued to be of intense concern to her. Bushnell believed that mistranslations were responsible for the social and spiritual subjugation of women. As may be seen in the above quotation, she was very "plain-spoken" in her writing. Further, she wrote, God does not approve "that law which places Jehovah in a position secondary to her husband in a wife's life." In another passage from her book, she courageously wrote:

If women must suffer domestic, legislative and ecclesiastical disabilities because Eve sinned, then must the Church harbor the appalling doctrine that Christ did not atone for all sin, because so long as the Church maintains these disabilities, the inevitable conclusion in the average mind will be the same as Tertullian’s - God's verdict on the (female) sex still holds good and the sex's guilt must still hold also.

— Katharine Bushnell, God's Word to Women

== Death ==
Bushnell died on January 26, 1946, only a few days before her 91st birthday.
