= Women's Christian Temperance Union New Zealand =

Anti alcohol and drugs movement

Women's Christian Temperance Union of New Zealand
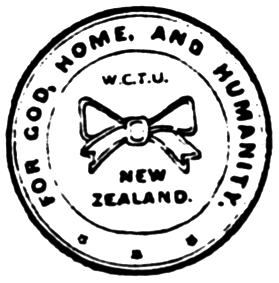
- Abbreviation: WCTU NZ
- Founded: 1885
- Founded at: Wellington, New Zealand
- Type: Umbrella organisation
- Legal status: Charitable trust
- Purpose: temperance
- President: Annette Paterson (2012–present)
- Website: wctu.org.nz

Women's Christian Temperance Union of New Zealand (WCTU NZ) is a non-partisan, non-denominational, and non-profit organisation that is the oldest continuously active national organisation of women in New Zealand. The national organisation began in 1885 during the visit to New Zealand by Mary Clement Leavitt, the first world missionary for the Woman's Christian Temperance Union. The WCTU NZ was an early branch of the World Woman's Christian Temperance Union and a founding affiliate of the National Council of Women of New Zealand. Men may join the WCTU NZ as honorary members.

== Mission statement ==
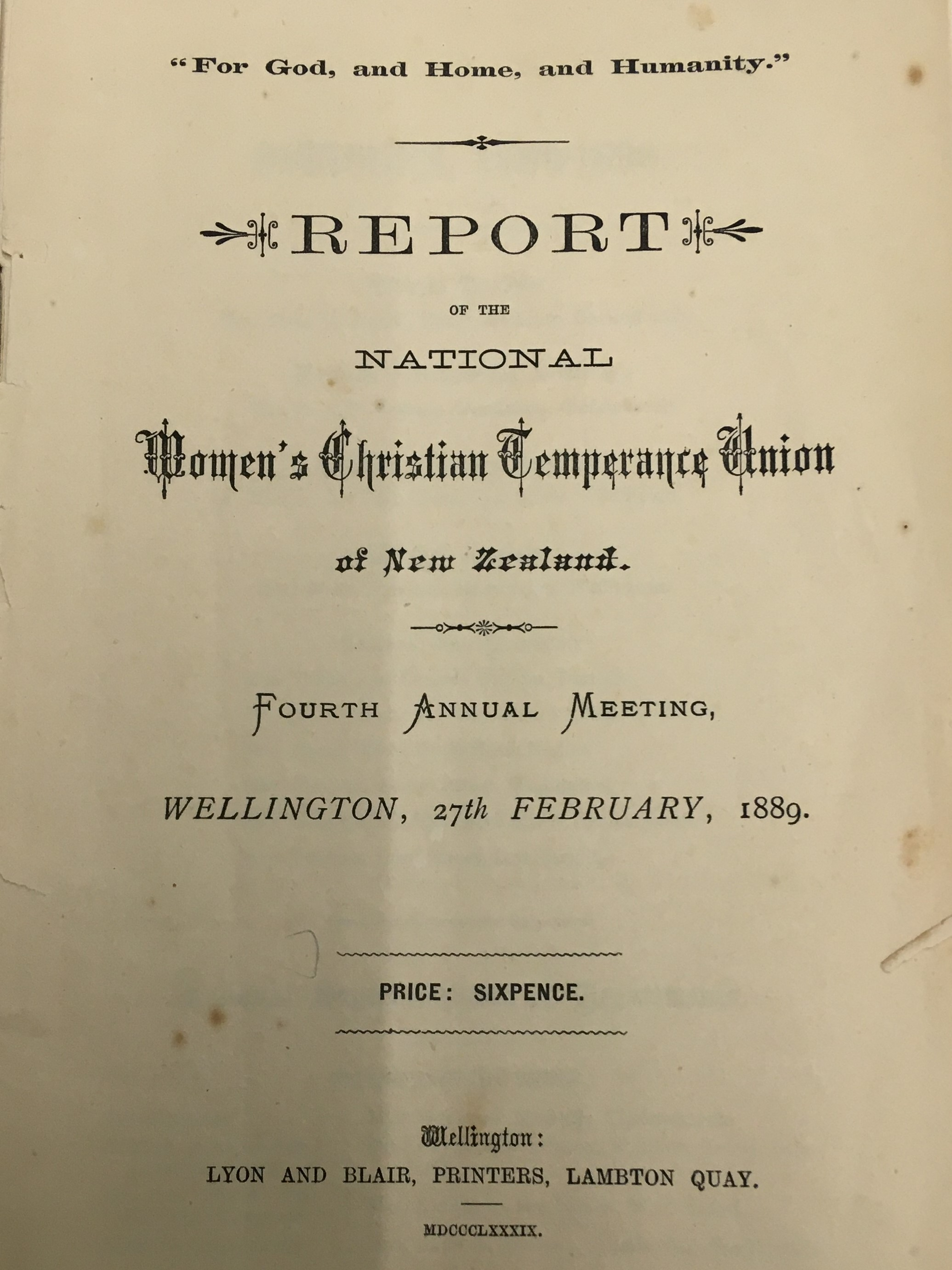

To reduce health and social problems by promoting a lifestyle free of alcohol and other drugs.

== Membership pledge ==
There have been different pledges required of new members over the years:

- I hereby solemnly promise, God being my helper, to abstain from all distilled, fermented, and malt liquors, including wine, beer, and cider, and to employ all proper means to discourage the use of and traffic in the same.
- I promise, by the help of God, never to use alcoholic beverages, other narcotics, or tobacco, and to encourage everyone else to do the same, fulfilling the command, "keep thyself pure."
- He whakaae tenei naku kia kaua ahau e kai tupeka, e inu ranei i tetahi mea e haurangi ai te tangata, kia kaua hoki ahau e whakaae ki te tamoko. Ma te Atua ahau e awhina. (Translated in today's English via Google Translator as follows: I agree not to smoke or drink anything that makes people drunk, and I do not approve of smoking. God help me.)
- We affirm our life-long pledge of total abstinence from all intoxicating liquors as a beverage, and our willingness to pursue all proper means to discourage and prevent their use in society. We pledge ourselves to work and to pray to this end by endeavouring to promote a personal purity of life, free from the menace of narcotic poisons and drugs, claiming always the promised guidance and help of God.

== White ribbon badge ==
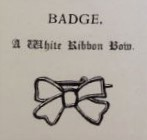

The official badge of the WCTU is a white ribbon: "a symbol of purity of purpose which binds together Christian women around the world." The white ribbon was first used by the American WCTU since its founding and in 1877 was officially featured in a bow. The white ribbon bow is worn pinned over the heart. During the union's early years in New Zealand, it would often be used together with the Gospel Temperance movement's blue ribbon.

=== Watchwords ===
The evangelistic work of all WCTU chapters is emphasised in the watchwords: Educate! Agitate! Legislate!

== Noontide prayer ==
Members of the WCTU around the world were encouraged to spend an hour at noon every day for prayer and reflection. This served not only as a symbol of an international collective but also a tradition that could be conducted in one's own language and Christian religious doctrines. Many clubs used the popularity of the tune "Beautiful Isle of Somewhere," (written in 1897) to have trained vocalists sing "Beautiful Hour of Noontide":

Somewhere the hands are lifted,/Somewhere the faith is strong./
Somewhere the haze is lifted,/ God hears and sees the wrong./
CHORUS: Noontide, noontide/Beautiful hour of noontide,/
On land, or sea, we bow the knee,/Beautiful hour of noontide.

As New Zealand sees the first noontide hour of each day around the world, the WCTU NZ was particularly interested in supporting this effort.

It is always noontide somewhere, / And across the awaking continents, / From shore to shore, somewhere, / Our prayers are rising evermore.

== Organisational structure ==
The WCTU world missionary Mary Clement Leavitt brought with her the American version of the WCTU constitution which expressed the unique structure of this women's organisation through commonly identified departments. Many of the branches that flourished maintained this structure at the local level. For example, when Leavitt helped form the Auckland WCTU in February 1885, this club began first with five departments (temperance literature, heredity and hygiene, legislation, education, evangelistic and prison work) and later added more as the organisation matured.

As per the national WCTU constitution recorded and published as part of the report of the first national conference, the Departments of Work that local branches could choose from to establish were:

1. Heredity
2. Hygiene
3. Scientific Instruction
4. Sunday-School Work
5. Juvenile Work
6. Temperance Literature
7. Influencing the Press
8. Evangelistic Work
9. Prisons and Police Stations
10. Railroad Work
11. Soldiers and Sailors
12. Unfermented Wine
13. Young Women's Work
14. Drawing-room Meetings
15. Kitchen Gardens
16. Flower Missions
17. Provincial and County Fairs
18. Legislation and Petitions
19. Work among Maoris
20. Impure Literature
21. Suppression of the Social Evil

Anne Ward, founding national president, made sure that at least some of this departmental infrastructure was in place at the national level and functioning across the various branches before she stepped down:

Evangelistic Work; Legislation and Petitions (later also called Franchise); Social Purity; Hygiene; Influencing the Press; Unfermented Wine; Juvenile Work; Gaol Work; Young Women's Work; Inebriate Home Work; Work among Young Women.

These departments were described in full in WCTU literature such as National Woman's Christian Temperance Union Annual Leaflet (Chicago: Union Signal Print, 1885).

== New Zealand and the World's WCTU ==
Mary C. Leavitt brought the World WCTU's Polyglot Petition for Home Protection to New Zealand to gain support of their leaders for their awareness campaign against the international trade in liquor and drugs as well as human trafficking. Undertaken by several of the earliest national presidents of the WCTU NZ, the Polyglot Petition gained 4,004 signatures from New Zealand. In June 1895, Kate Sheppard attended the World's WCTU conference in London, and it was there that she was encouraged to start the National Council of Women of New Zealand. Anderson Hughes-Drew, a New Zealander, served as an official round-the-world missionary for the World's WCTU. Margaret Jackson, WCTU NZ President, was elected president of the World WCTU in 2001 and served in that role until 2004.

== National work undertaken in early years ==
Nascent WCTU chapters in New Zealand fought against laws inherited from England that supported and encouraged male-centred vices.

=== Regulation and Suppression of the Trade in Liquor and Narcotics ===
The temperance movement in New Zealand had been growing in power and passion by the late nineteenth century. Temperance societies in New Zealand started up early in the colonial times and gained strength from evangelical missionaries travelling from the U.S. and England:

- Independent Order of Rechabites (also known as the Sons and Daughters of Rechab), primarily located in Auckland (established 1863) and Wellington (established 1866)
- Band of Hope Union (established 1863)
- Independent (later International) Order of Good Templars (established 1872) with the Temperance Herald published out of Dunedin
- Sons and Daughters of Temperance (established 1871)

There were many pro-temperance political allies in Parliament, such as Sir Julius Vogel and Sir William Fox, and women had gained the right to municipal suffrage in 1867. Yet, women activists felt they could do more than just try to influence politics at the local level. In 1885 Anne Ward led a women's group lobbying Sir Julius Vogel to support the reform of the 1881 Licensing Act to allow for married women to vote on every question associated with that Act, since "women were, in numberless instances, the greatest sufferers from the effects of the drink traffic." This work became the central force for the WCTU NZ.

=== Campaign against abuse of barmaids ===
Mary Leavitt learned in Auckland of the activist women's anger at the current liquor laws that allowed for women and girls to be recruited as barmaids. Sometimes the publican was obvious in their advertisements, indicating that a successful hire must be young and attractive, intimating a connection between the liquor industry and prostitution. The WCTU sought to expose the very real dangers of violence towards and seduction then abuse of young women. A convincing argument of the WCTU centred on the logic that barmaids could not, because of the long hours and everyday exposure to the vices of men, become a good wife and mother. The Auckland WCTU alone gathered 13,000 signatures out of the 18,537 sent in 1885 to parliament in a petition against the employment of barmaids.

=== Repeal of the Contagious Diseases Act and halt to human trafficking ===
The WCTU NZ worked for the repeal of the Contagious Diseases Act of 1869, which discriminated against women and upheld the legality of prostitution. Any woman might be stopped at any time by the police and detained for "inspection" for a sexually transmitted disease. A woman could also be forced to undertake treatment in hospitals or workhouse infirmaries. This double standard supported by law meant that women shouldered all the consequences (real or suspected) of the spread of venereal disease. The WCTU NZ collaborated with the World WCTU in raising awareness about the vulnerability of women and children taken in bondage for sex work. In New Zealand the emphasis was more about the abuse by police enforcing social hygiene codes and participants in the thriving sex trade, especially in the many international ports of New Zealand. Another component to the idea of giving greater protection to women and girls was the campaign to raise the age of consent to 21 years.

=== Scientific temperance instruction for children and youth ===
Since children were often sent to pubs to purchase alcohol for adults or were easily swayed to work in various parts of the liquor trade, the WCTU NZ early on worked to reform school curriculum and require scientific temperance instruction. In February 1887, the WCTU NZ national convention sent a formal resolution to the Minister for Education in which the Union sought for scientific temperance instruction be made compulsory in public school. Part of this campaign included the diseases associated with not only with alcohol but also the use of tobacco and the second-hand effects from those who smoke nearby. The WCTU NZ paid for literature to support school curriculum including textbooks, charts, songs and teaching lessons. In the early years, the WCTU NZ encouraged their local chapters to establish a "Cradle Roll" which included elaborate parties for children and encouraged their mothers to promise to teach their children about "total abstinence and purity." WCTU NZ collaborated with other local temperance groups to establish youth-led Loyal Temperance Legions which had their own officers.

=== Welfare work ===
Many communities were accustomed to and relied on collaborations among Christian churchwomen to provide emergency efforts or long-term resources for the needy. The WCTU NZ unions provided an organisational and scientific approach to what was already in hand by volunteers in local organisations such as the Ladies Christian Association or Ladies Committees of the Blue Ribbon Army. WCTU NZ unions organised hospitals, female refuges, sailors' rest homes, girls' hostels, orphanages, free kindergartens, infant care at big social events, non-alcoholic refreshment or tea rooms, youth homes or education centres for working children, "prison gate" half-way homes, and missionary outreach in Maori communities. Even after women gained the right to vote in national elections, the WCTU NZ continued to fight laws that kept women from their full rights as citizens, including running for elective office or co-guardianship of children. They supported the Prohibition League and No-License Council. They pushed for anti-gambling regulations and protested against State licensed lotteries which they saw as predatory especially on the working poor. The WCTU NZ also supported the decriminalisation of "therapeutic abortion" – they saw the abortion law as punitive against women but argued that men were equally a part of the process.

=== Petitions to New Zealand government for woman suffrage ===
The WCTU NZ petition campaigns for national woman suffrage were supported by directives from its founding chapters and the first convention in 1886.

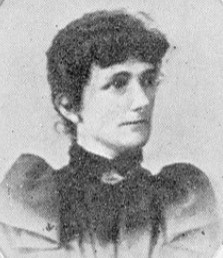
Anne Titboald Ward (1825 – 1896), inaugural president of the Women's Christian Temperance Union of New Zealand

- 1885 – deputation led by WCTU NZ Franchise Superintendent Mrs. G. Clark of Christchurch to petition Sir Julius Vogel to bring in a bill for woman suffrage; petitions signed by 18,537 to forbid women to serve in any capacity in public houses.
- 1886 – two petitions for women's suffrage, signed by 350 women, under the leadership of WCTU NZ president Anne Ward went to the House of Representatives.
- 1887 – an anti-barmaid petition organised in collaboration with the New Zealand Alliance for the Suppression and Prohibition of the Liquor Traffic with over 8,000 signatures; and a petition protesting the wording of the Electoral Bill that excluded women and reminding the Speaker of the woman suffrage bill passed in that same session - the petition was signed by the WCTU NZ president (Anne Ward), secretary (Susan Brett), treasurer (Mrs. C.A. Baker) and Superintendent of the Franchise Department (Mrs. G. Clark) accompanied by telegrams from six local Union presidents.
- 1888 – two petitions for woman suffrage from Emma E. Packe, WCTU NZ President with 780 signatures presented to the Legislative Council
- 1891 – eight petitions for woman suffrage with a total of 10,085 signatures, drive led by WCTU NZ president Catherine Fulton and national Franchise Superintendent Kate Sheppard, presented to the Lower House by Sir John Hall and Upper House by Hon. John Fulton who introduced a Female Suffrage Bill.
- 1892 – petitions for woman suffrage gathered by local Political Franchise Leagues (women's rights activist Anna Stout started the first of these in Dunedin) in partnership with WCTU NZ Franchise superintendents with 20,274 signatures to support Ballance's Electoral Bill.
- 1893 – Political Franchise Leagues and WCTU NZ local unions took about four months to gather thirteen petitions for woman suffrage which were signed by 31,872 women twenty-one years of age and over. More than 500 individual pages were glued together with wallpaper backing (but leaving out 12 other petitions with approximately 1500 names). This dramatic version of the petitions - a single roll measuring 270 metres - was wheeled into Parliament in a barrow where the roll was unfurled by Sir John Hall who claimed with was the largest petition ever presented to any Parliament in Australasia.

== The White Ribbon (journal) ==
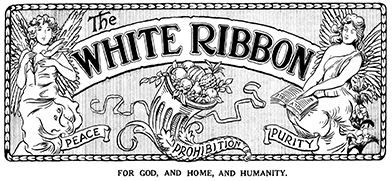
Banner for The White Ribbon, official journal of the Women's Christian Temperance Union of New Zealand

Local newspapers and contemporary temperance journals (such as the Temperance Herald and The Prohibitionist) carried articles about the WCTU abroad and in New Zealand. Also, local chapters would supply content for regular columns such as "Temperance Notes" in local papers, e.g., Wanganui Chronicle, and New Zealand Herald. In May 1895 the WCTU began publishing its own journal, The White Ribbon. Sheppard was the first editor, followed by Lucy Lovell-Smith (1903–1908). The longest serving editor was Nellie Peryman (1913–1945). In 1965 The White Ribbon became The New Zealand White Ribbon Digest, and then ceased publication in 2011. Now called the White Ribbon Bulletin, the official WCTU NZ publication is in newsletter format and, as with its predecessors, archived in the National Library of New Zealand.

== Founding leadership ==
By the time of the first national convention held in Wellington 23–24 February 1886, there were fifteen local unions organised along the same WCTU constitution.

Founding Unions Organized by Mary C. Leavitt (and local presidents)

- 6 August 1884 (re-formed on 22 June 1885), Invercargill: Eliza Ann Palmer Brown (then Roberta Annie Swayne Hinton)
- 4 February 1885, Auckland: Ann Parkes Brame
- 5 May 1885, Dunedin: Catherine Fulton
- 5 May 1885, Port Chalmers: Mary Ann Roebuck Monson
- 15 May 1885, Christchurch: Emma Eliza De Winton Packe
- 28 May 1885, Rangiora: Grace Roberts Rowse (also president of Petone WCTU chapter after 1901)
- 11 June 1885, Napier: Mrs. T. G. Paterson
- 16 June 1885, Oamaru: Agnes Hunter Train Todd

Founding Unions Organized by Anne Ward

- 3 September 1885 – Wellington
- 16 September 1885 – Nelson
- 5 October 1885 – Wanganui
- 27 October 1885 – New Plymouth
- 29 October 1885 – Hawera
- 31 October 1885 – Patea
- January 1886 – Ashburton

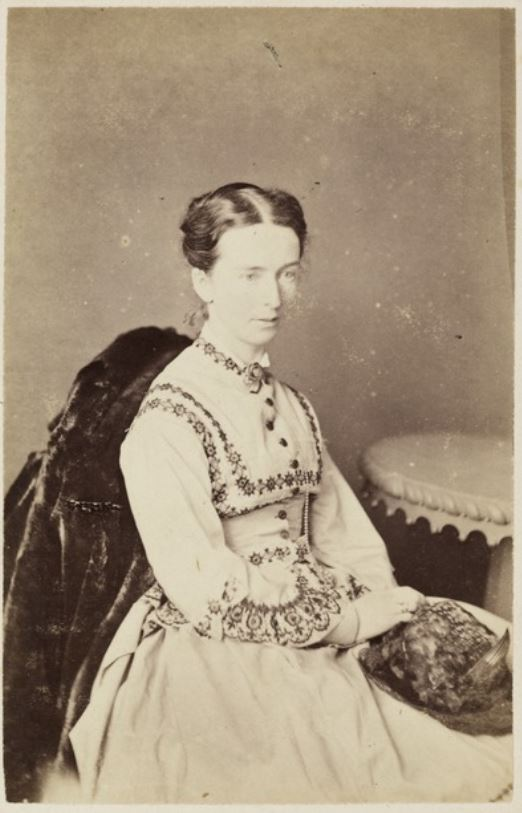
Emma Eliza de Winton Packe (1840–1914), second president of WCTU NZ

Unions Formed 1887 - 1895

- 1887 - Roslyn
- 1888 - West Taieri (Outram), Lyttelton
- 1889 - Timaru (Mosgiel, North East Valley)
- 1891 - Palmerston
- 1892 - Kaiapoi, Fielding, Marton, Blenheim, West Coast (Hokitika)
- 1893 - Levin
- 1894 - Hastings

== WCTU NZ National Presidents ==
- Anne Ward of Christchurch, 1886–1887
- Emma E. de Winton Packe of Christchurch, 1887–1889
- Catherine Valpy Fulton of Dunedin, 1890–1892
- Annie Jane Allen Schnackenberg of Auckland, 1892–1900
- Lily May Kirk Atkinson of Wellington, 1901–1905
- Fanny Buttery Cole of Christchurch, 1906–1913
- Rachel Hull Don of Dunedin, 1914–1926
- Priscilla Kennedy Crabb of Palmerston North, Acting President while Rachel Don traveled abroad from April 1920 - March 1921
- Elizabeth Best Taylor, OBE., JP. of Christchurch, 1926–1935
- Jessie Ann McKenzie Hiett of Dunedin, 1935–1945
- Cybele Ethyl Kirk, JP. of Wellington, 1946–1949
- Catherine M. McLay of Rotorua, 1949–1951
- Constance Toomer of Nelson, 1951–58, 1966–68
- Mrs. A.T. Richards, JP. of Auckland, 1959–1961
- Mrs. F.A. Rankin of Nelson, 1961–1965
- Constance Toomer's second term, 1966–1968
- Catherine Polglase of Nelson, 1969–1990
- Margaret Jackson of Cambridge, 1991–1995 (also World WCTU president, 2001–2004)
- Clara Smith, 1996
- Alma Laurenson, 1997–1998
- Annette Paterson, 1999–2003; 2012–present
- Molly Aitchison, 2004–2009
- Ruth Hillsdon, 2010–2011
- Annette Paterson's second term, 2012–present

== Conservative turn after World War II ==
The global post-war conservative movement influenced the WCTU NZ. For example, they took a strong stand against the push for human rights for homosexuals. Presidents Constance Toomer (1952–1958, 1966–1968) and Catherine Polglase (1969–1990) stood out as significant figures in women's social and religious activity in New Zealand even as the government began taking over the role of fact-finding and analysis of issues formerly seen as the purview of the WCTU NZ. During the 1960s and 1970s, with the rise of second-wave feminist ideas and protests, the WCTU NZ criticised some contemporary moves towards equality for women, such as the United Nations Convention on the Elimination of All Forms of Discrimination Against Women (CEDAW).

== Recent activities ==
Although has membership declined, the WCTU NZ still holds annual conventions and sends representatives to the World WCTU conventions. WCTU NZ's former president Margaret Jackson was elected president of the World Union, serving from 2001 to 2004. The WCTU continues to demonstrate a strong appreciation of its history and its role in gaining women's suffrage at the national level. The WCTU NZ participated in the WCTU-Australia "Be Healthy – Live Smoke-free!" colouring competition at the end of 2017 which was open to both Australian and New Zealand entrants.

== See also ==
- Alcohol in New Zealand
- Blue Ribbon Army (also known as Gospel Temperance Mission)
- International Organisation of Good Templars
- List of New Zealand suffragists
- National Council of Women of New Zealand
- New Zealand alcohol licensing referendums 1894–1987
- Temperance movement in New Zealand
