= Blue ribbon badge =

Symbol of the temperance movement

The blue ribbon badge was a symbol of the temperance movement in 19th century North America.

The badge was created by Francis Murphy, 1836–1907, who was a chief advocate of the temperance movement in the United States and abroad in his generation. It was inspired by a Bible verse, Numbers 15:38-39, which says: "Speak unto the children of Israel, and bid them that they make them fringes in the borders of their garments, throughout their generations, and that they put upon the fringe of the borders a ribband of blue : and it shall be unto you for a fringe, that ye may look upon it, and remember all the commandments of the Lord, and do them."

The ribbon was worn by those who agreed with a pledge of abstinence from alcohol consumption as a beverage, as advocated by Francis Murphy. The movement emerged in the northeastern United States during the early 1870s and spread to Canada and Great Britain by the end of the decade. By the mid-1880s, millions had taken the temperance pledge and wore the blue ribbon.

The movement grew out of New England reform clubs. In 1870, Murphy was imprisoned for violating the Maine Law, and when he was released, he began speaking against alcohol and became a leader in reform clubs. He made evangelical Protestantism a central focus of the movement, and also applied evangelical techniques. He spoke in large public halls in a revival-like style encouraging large groups of men to come forward and take the pledge. He focused his speeches on compassion for drunkards, and did not condemn drinkers or the sellers of alcohol.

In 1874, Murphy was invited to Chicago by Frances Elizabeth Caroline Willard, then president of the Women's Christian Temperance Union (WCTU), and Murphy began speaking in the Midwest. Murphy was very successful and the movement expanded into the Midwest. After a speech in Pittsburgh on November 26, 1876, 40,000 residents signed the pledge within ten weeks. Henry J. Heinz was among the Pittsburgh residents who adopted the reform, and the number of saloons in Pittsburgh went from over 1000 in 1877 to less than 100 a few years later. Murphy also worked with John Wanamaker of the WCTU in Philadelphia in 1877, and later traveled to Canada and then to the UK where he met Queen Victoria. D. I. K. Rhine became the figurehead of the Canadian movement, until sexual scandal stalled his progress. William Noble and W. J. Palmer led the movement in the UK.

From 1880 to 1882, the cause of abstinence was revived in Great Britain by the Gospel Temperance or Blue Ribbon movement, based in America. They sent a member named Richard Booth to promote their cause in England through mass meetings held up and down the country. In 1882 and 1883, Rev. M. Baxter edited The Blue Ribbon Official Gazette and Gospel Temperance Herald, a journal dedicated to the Temperance movement. Several clubs of the Blue Ribbon Army and the Gospel Temperance Union established themselves in the British colonies. Booth set off on a highly successful campaign across New Zealand and Australia in 1885. Accompanied by his wife, he often traveled with other temperance evangelists such as Mary Greenleaf Clement Leavitt, the first world missionary of the Woman's Christian Temperance Union.

In 1874, Henry A. Reynolds created the Red Ribbon Reform Club in Bangor, Maine, inspired by the Blue Ribbon Movement.
