= Polyglot Petition =

1884 petition to ban drugs and alcohol

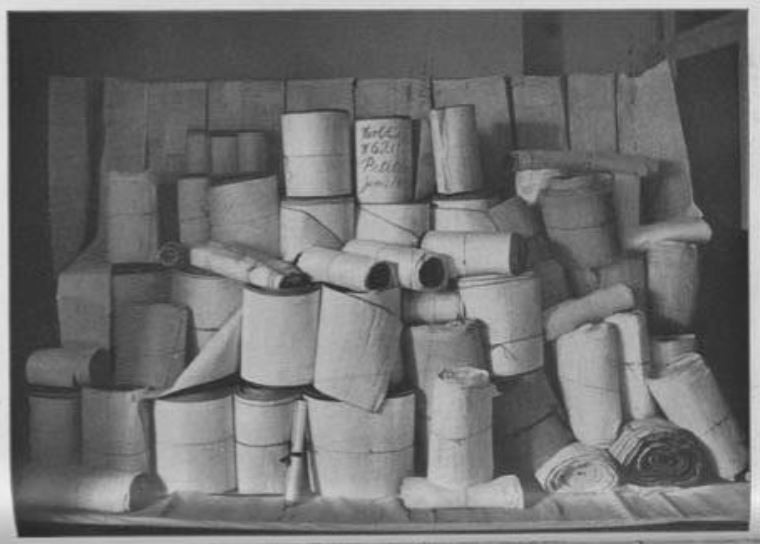
- The Polyglot Petition, 1898
- Created: 1884
- Location: Woman's Christian Temperance Union Administration Building
- Author: Frances Willard
- Purpose: To provide evidence of concern by women about the global and local impact of the liquor trade, drugs and legalised vice

The Polyglot Petition for Home Protection was the first world-wide proclamation against the manufacturing and international trade in liquor and drugs as well as the prohibition of legalised vice. It served as a first major campaign to raise public awareness of the need for international agreements on controls for opium and its derivatives.

== Description of the petition ==
Addressed to all rulers and nations of the world, this petition to adopt prohibition was written by the American Woman's Christian Temperance Union (WCTU) president Frances Willard in 1884. It was carried across the world by at least four World WCTU missionaries who gathered signatures of nearly eight million people in more than fifty countries. The signatures can be categorized in three basic sections: signatures of individual women, written endorsements of men, and attestations of leaders of groups that had endorsed the petition.

The proclamation was first launched at the International Temperance Congress in Antwerp, Belgium, in 1885.

The signed petitions from the U.S. (over 750,000) were sent to Mrs. Rebecca C. Shuman in Evanston, Illinois who trimmed and mounted them on white muslin, one-half yard in width and bound with red ribbon on one side and blue ribbon on the other. The first convention of the World's WCTU was held in Boston in 1891 where the petitions served as wall-coverings at the Faneuil Hall. Signed petitions from Great Britain (350,000 signatories) came in already mounted on cloth in time for presentation to the U.S. president, Grover Cleveland, in February 1895. The Polyglot Petition is archived in the Woman's Christian Temperance Union Administration Building in Evanston, Illinois, United States of America.

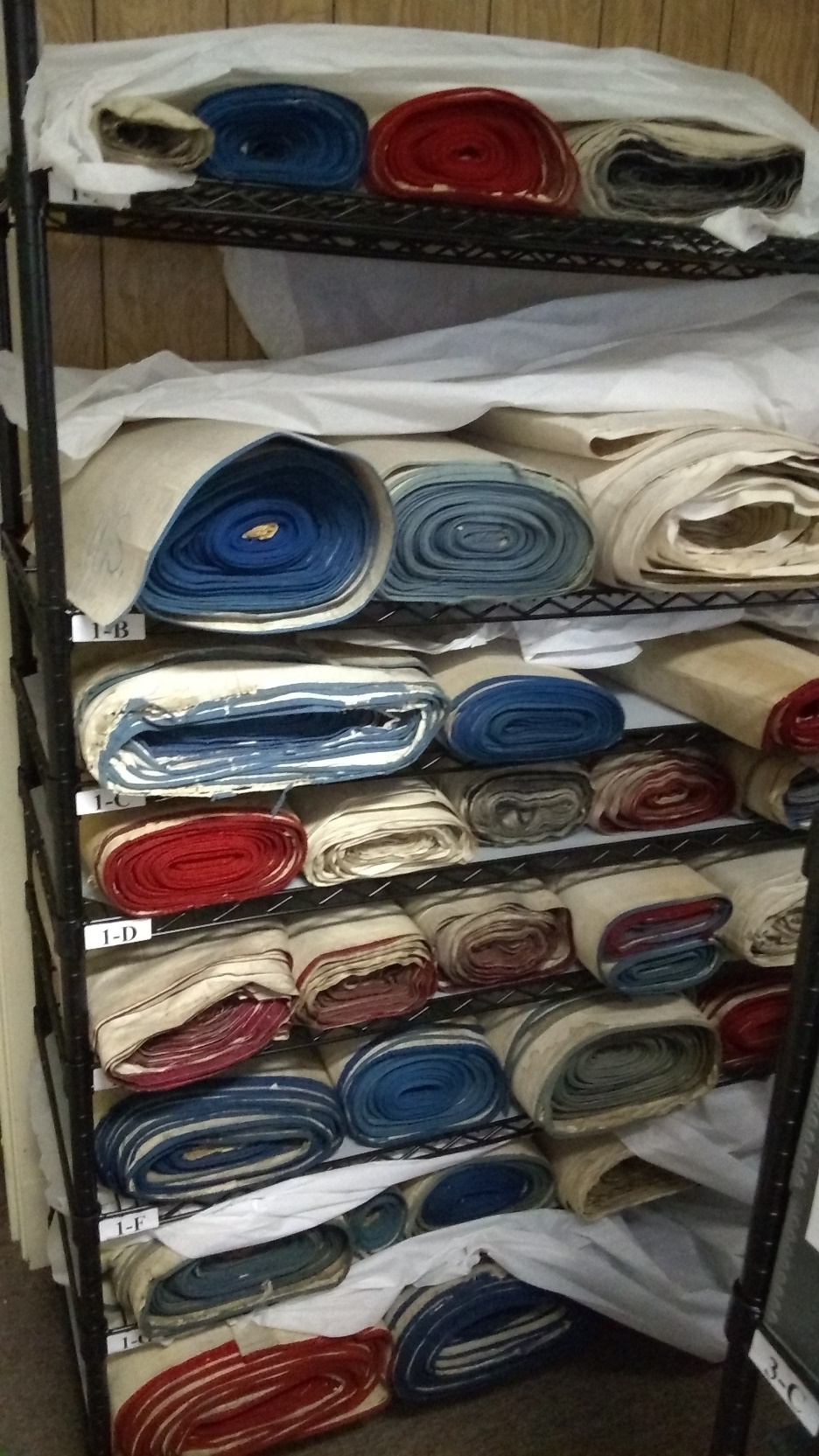
A portion of the Polyglot Petition archived at the WCTU Administration Building in Evanston, Illinois

== Purpose ==
The International Women's Temperance Union was formed in 1876. And by 1883 the World WCTU became the organizing unit for communicating with the WCTU chapters around the world. The Polyglot Petition served as an important vehicle for action across the networks being formed. In 1891 Frances Willard was elected president of the World WCTU. "There is a heart-language that they are learning in every nation, and nothing can stand before the sisterhood of woman that is now growing up around the world."

WWCTU leadership hoped that the simple act of signing the petition would accomplish several things at once: it would spur membership and support for the WWCTU; capture media attention for the cause; and, by using the signatures of women leaders in their own countries, influence world leaders to make change.

== Opening paragraphs ==
To the Governments of the World (Collectively and Severally).
Honored Rulers, Representatives, and Brothers:

We, your petitioners, although belonging to the physically weaker sex, are strong of heart to love our homes, our native land, and the world’s family of nations. We know that clear brains and pure hearts make honest lives and happy homes, and that by these the nations prosper and the time is brought nearer when the world shall be at peace. We know that indulgence in alcohol and opium, and in other vices which disgrace our social life, makes misery for all the world, and most of all for us and our children. We know that stimulants and opiates are sold under legal guarantees which make the governments partners in the traffic by accepting as revenue a portion of the profits, and we know with shame that they are often forced by treaty upon populations either ignorant or unwilling. We know that the law might do much now left undone to raise the moral tone of society and render vice difficult. We have no power to prevent these great iniquities, beneath which the whole world groans, but you have power to redeem the honor of the nations from an indefensible complicity. We therefore, come to you with the united voices of representative women from every land, beseeching you to raise the standard of the law to that of Christian morals, to strip away the safeguards and sanctions of the State from the drink traffic and opium trade, and to protect our homes by the total prohibition of these curses of civilization throughout all the territory over which your Government extends.

== Response to Call by World WCTU Missionaries ==
The fully signed Polyglot Petition represents the appeal for prohibitionism by representatives in the following countries and geographic areas (names and spelling are contemporary to the time of petitions signed):

- United States – Forty-four States, five Territories and Alaska
- Canada – Nova Scotia, New Brunswick, Prince Edward Island, Quebec, Ontario, Manitoba, British Columbia
- Newfoundland
- Mexico
- Jamaica
- Bahamas
- Madeira
- South America – Brazil, Chile, Uruguay
- Europe – England, Scotland, Ireland, Wales, France, Holland, Belgium, Denmark, Norway, Sweden, Spain, Russia, Finland, Turkey, Bulgaria
- Asia – China, Japan, India, Burmah, Siam, Corea, Ceylon
- Africa – Egypt, Congo Free State, Transvaal, West and South Africa, Angola
- Madagascar
- Mozambique
- Australia – Victoria, South Australia, Queensland, New South Wales
- Tasmania
- New Zealand
- Micronesia
- Hawaiian Islands

The text of the petition itself was first presented at the International Temperance Congress in Belgium in September 1885. The signed petitions were presented to many sovereign leaders, including to the U.S. President Grover Cleveland in February 1885 and to Great Britain's Queen Victoria in June 1895. The public display of the many rolls of the signed petition came at the first World WCTU convention in Boston in 1891. At the second World WCTU convention in Chicago in 1893, all the signatures gathered thus far were displayed, but thereafter – due to the expense of packaging up all the rolls – only sections were sent out to be displayed at the World's WCTU conventions.

== Results ==
In the early 20th century, several countries legislated prohibition or restrictions of the manufacturing and business of alcohol. See list of and list of countries with alcohol prohibition. The nations most impacted by prohibition enactments were the Nordic countries (the Faroe Islands 1907–1992; Sweden 1914–1955; Iceland 1915–1922; Norway 1916–1927; and, Finland 1919–1932), the United States (1920–1933), Canada (1901–1948), and the Russian Empire/USSR (1914–1925). Many nations continue to levy a so-called “sin” tax on alcohol and certain legalized narcotics such as tobacco products, as well as protecting children from having access.

Trafficking in prohibited drugs intertwined with imperial control over (or support for) the opium trade (see Opium Wars). But, the first international drug control treaty was finalized at the First International Opium Convention at The Hague in 1912 and went into force globally in 1919 with the Treaty of Versailles.

The first international agreement to fight against the trafficking of women and children came in 1904 with the International Agreement for the suppression of the White Slave Traffic and oversight supported under the League of Nations. This work was expanded under the United Nations Global Initiative to Fight Human Trafficking after a national convention in 1949.

== See also ==
- Jessie Ackermann
- Dr. Kate Bushnell
- Mary Greenleaf Clement Leavitt
- Margaret Bright Lucas
- Lady Henry Somerset
- Frances Willard
- Frances Willard House (Evanston, Illinois)
- Prohibition
- Woman's Christian Temperance Union
- Woman's Christian Temperance Union Administration Building

== Bibliography ==
- "Brief Sketch of the Woman's Christian Temperance Union" (PDF).
- Bordin, Ruth (1986). Frances Willard: A Biography. Chapel Hill: The University of North Carolina Press.
- Gordon, Anna A. (1898). The beautiful life of Frances E. Willard: A memorial volume (Illinois Digital Archives, Illinois State Library ed.). Chicago, IL: Woman's Temperance Publishing Association.
- Keating, James (2020). "For God and home and every land: Suffrage internationalism in the World's Woman's Christian Temperance Union". Distant sisters: Australasian women and the international struggle for the vote, 1880–1914. Manchester, England: Manchester University Press.
