= Jessie Ackermann =

Social reformer, feminist, journalist, writer and traveller

Jessie A. Ackermann
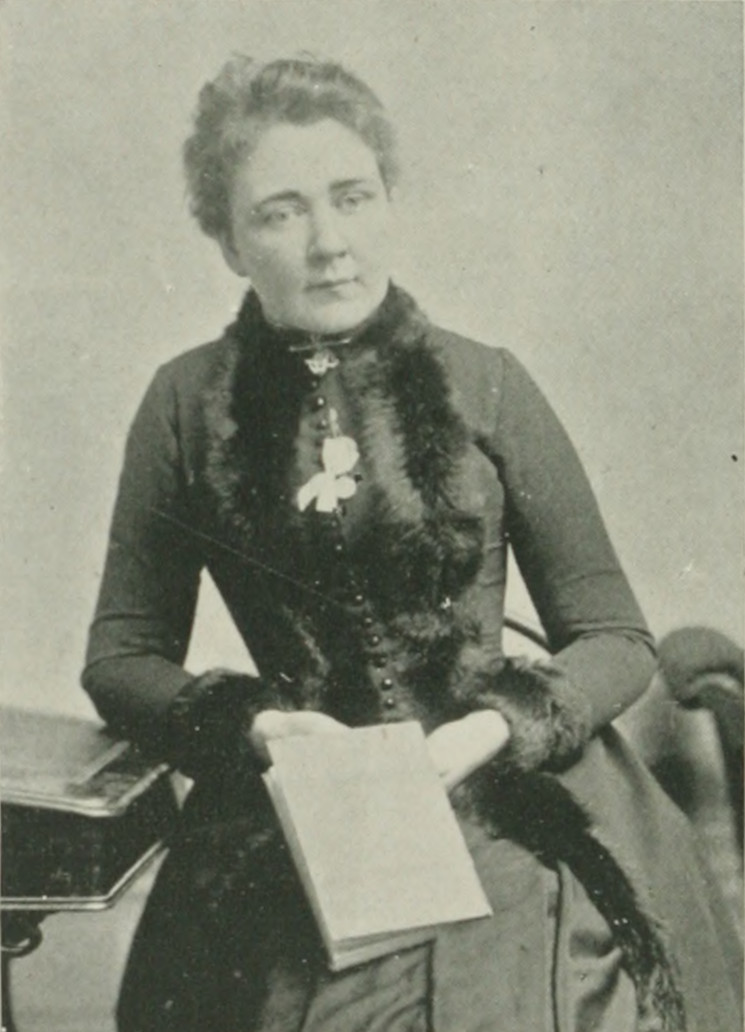
- "A Woman of the Century"
- Born: July 4, 1857; Frankfort, Illinois
- Died: March 31, 1951 (aged 93); Pomona, California
- Occupation: Social reformer

Jessie Ackermann (July 4, 1857 – March 31, 1951) was an American social reformer, feminist, journalist, writer and traveller. She was the second round-the-world missionary appointed by the World's Woman's Christian Temperance Union (WWCTU), becoming in 1891 the inaugural president of the federated Australasian Woman's Christian Temperance Union (WCTU), Australia's largest women's reform group. Although an American, Ackermann is considered a major voice in the Australian suffrage movement.

As well as being the author of three books, Ackermann gave talks on travel and temperance around the world and became a skilled and popular speaker with a wide following. She was described as a "speaker of no mean order". In her talks, she advocated equal political, legal and property rights for women.

Ackermann was actively involved in campaigns for women's rights as well as the ongoing international struggle against opium and also tobacco. She became World's superintendent of the WCTU's anti-opium department in 1893–95 and in 1891 established an Anti Narcotics Department of the WCTU in Australia. In 1906 she was made one of the only women fellows of the Royal Scottish Geographical Society.

== Life ==
The daughter of Charles Ackerman(n), and his wife Amanda, née French, Ackermann grew up in Chicago and then moved to California, where in 1880 she studied at the University of California, Berkeley, but did not graduate. In 1881 she began working as a temperance organiser for the Independent Order of Good Templars in California, moving to the Woman's Christian Temperance Union in 1888, "with its special opportunities for work among women". After undertaking a mission to British Columbia and Alaska she was chosen as world missionary at the WCTU national convention in New York City in October 1888. Before the WCTU, Ackermann had served the World Order of Rechabites, whose motto was: "Agitate, educate, legislate and demonstrate". In the 1920s she lived in Johnson City, Tennessee and in the 1930s, mostly at Los Angeles.

== WCTU work ==
=== International ===
Ackermann left the United States in January 1889 to begin the first of her world tours. In 1910, she was reported as having completed six world tours and slept in 2,700 beds" but she is generally credited with having circumnavigated the globe eight times. Her travels were recorded by letters to the WCTU publication, The Union Signal and Ladies Home Companion.

=== Australian ===
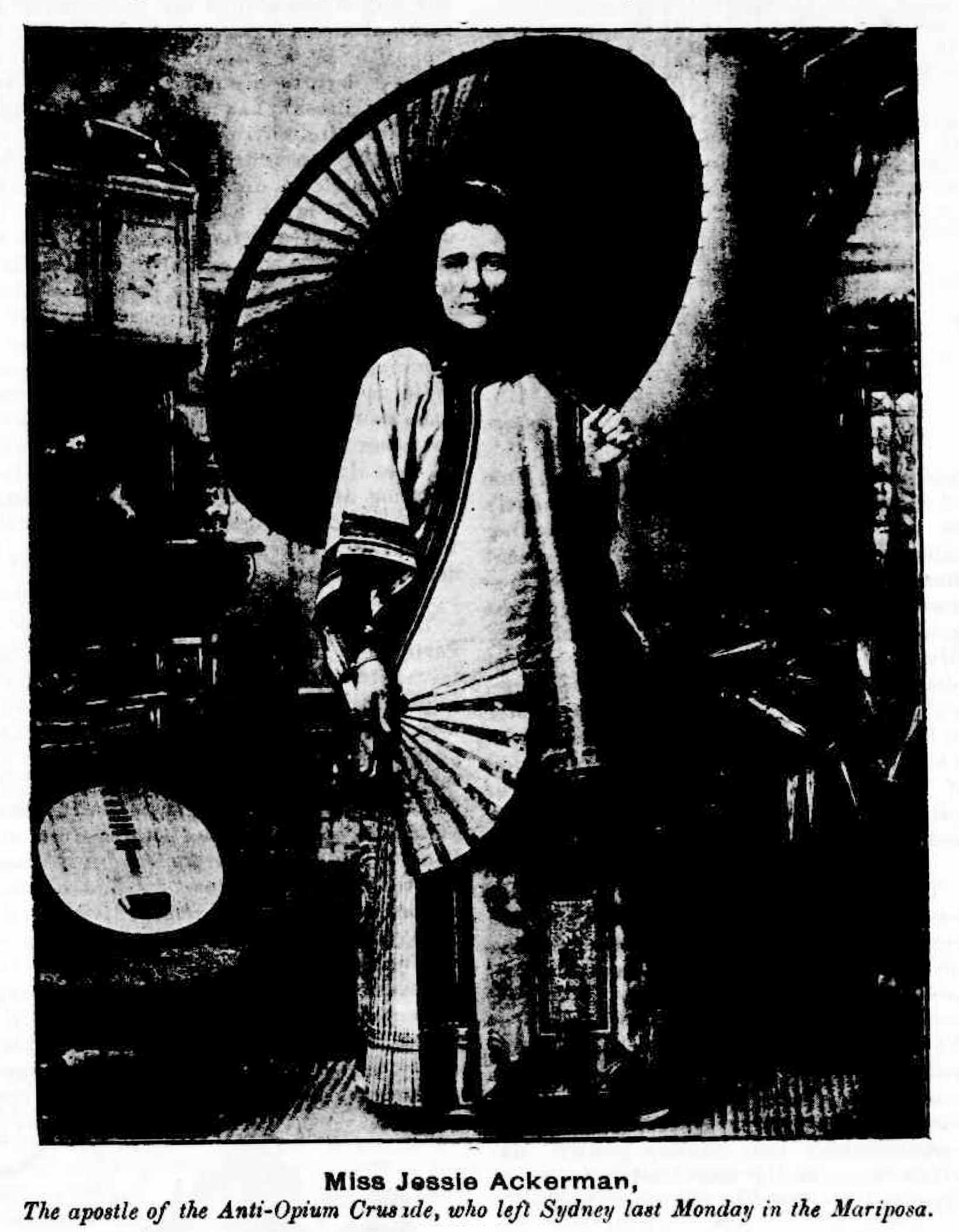
Ackermann attired in Japanese costume (1893)

Ackermann arrived at Adelaide in South Australia in 1889, to continue the work started by Mary Leavitt, the WCTU's first world missionary. Described as "vital and charismatic", Ackermann inspired the founding of the WCTU of Western Australia by her visit in 1891 and her administrative efforts revealed considerable organisational skill. For example, she established an Anti Narcotics Department in 1891. She also held a ten-day temperance mission in Adelaide Town Hall and organised the first Colonial Convention of the WCTU of South Australia, with a membership of 1112 and 23 local unions. The first local Union in Western Australia was formed in York, with another five soon following. By August 1891, a Colonial Union with 155 members had been established. Anna Adams Gordon wrote: "The Round-the-World White Ribbon Missionaries who have since gone out under the banner of the World's WCTU are Miss Jessie Ackermann, of California, who honeycombed Australasia with local Unions, federating them into a National WCTU of their own, of which she became President ..." The Woman's Christian Temperance Union of Australasia (later renamed the National Women's Christian Temperance Union of Australia) was formed on the 25th May, 1891 at a meeting held in Melbourne for the purpose of federating the existing Colonial Unions. This was probably the first interstate gathering of women's organisations held in Australia and the Union was the first national women's organization in the country. "At the second national convention of the Australian WCTU in Sydney in 1894, Jessie Ackermann proudly proclaimed, "Our banner floats in forty-seven lands: and in forty-seven languages can we read our motto 'For God and Home and Every Land' ".

Ackermann lectured both in cities and outback towns using lantern slide techniques. So popular and well-known was she in Australia that the state of her health was reported across the country. For example, in 1895 newspapers in Tasmania and in New South Wales reported that she was advised to go to Iceland for her health and that she was recovering her health during a stay with Frances Willard in England.

In Australia, the goal of mid-nineteenth century temperance organisations was to give residents the right to veto licenses to sell alcohol in their towns and suburbs, in contrast to the more ambitious goal of the temperance movement in the United States which was prohibition (the so-called Maine law). The concern of women was to prevent the "ill-usage" they experienced as a result of men drinking. In 1885, 45,000 women in the state of Victoria (almost a quarter of the adult female population) signed a petition asking the government to introduce local option to protect their sex from bad treatment associated with alcohol consumption.

== Travels ==
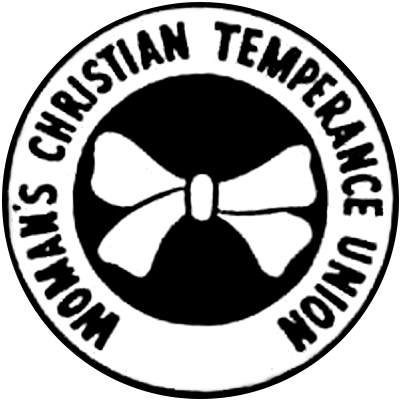
The logo of the WCTU

Few 19th-century women travelled as extensively as Ackermann. It has been pointed out that "she visited so many lands not simply from a spirit of adventure or from curiosity but as a paid organizer, or as her employers called it, a 'round the world missionary' of a large and prominent organization ...", was one of those Victorian women missionaries who "revelled in the travel as much as in the saving of souls". It has been argued that such "reform-minded travel" became in part, a means of demonstrating global awareness and global reach." Although she travelled partly to establish WCT Unions around the world, the journeys were also to undertake work as "a civilizer, feminist, and reporter of the conditions of women and the disadvantaged throughout the world". In a conference during her visit to China, for example, all women delegates were made voting members "amid storms of applause" in contrast to the previous meeting thirteen years earlier, when the idea of a woman presenting her work resulted in many "indignant" people leaving the room. Her first-hand reports of trips through Asia were also a means of raising funds for her temperance campaign.

Ackermann visited countries on the continents of Europe, Asia, Africa and Australasia and she claimed unusually close contact with local people: "I was a guest in nearly two thousand homes, all kinds of homes, rich and poor ...". Beyond the difficulties of her travels to many continents and countries, some of her expeditions involved the kind of extra difficulty that would come to be characterised in later times as "adventure travel". For example, she went camping in 1898 in the Yosemite Valley in America to regain her strength for more travel; she rode horseback through the Australian bush to the Jenolan Caves before going underground to explore them; and she defied convention by going down a coal-mine.

Her reports and involvement were also unusual because of her strong declared interest in the position of women everywhere. She pointed out that only a short time previously, some of her own countrywomen had had to be released from slavery and 'elevated to the dignity of womanhood'. She exhorted American women "to look outward, to take American women's 'higher civilization' to influence women's lives everywhere.". In Philadelphia, USA, she stated that she "had never seen any [philanthropic work] equaling or so large as Sunday Breakfast Association.

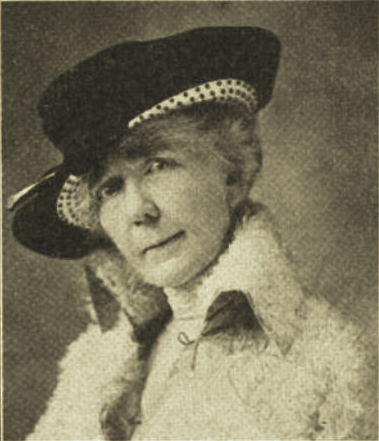
(1925)

Countries and regions Ackermann visited included: Afghanistan via the Khyber Pass and Peshawar; Alaska, to which she was first sent by the WCTU (before it became an American state); Australia, including the states of South Australia, New South Wales, Victoria, Western Australia and Tasmania; (she declared Hobart to be "delightful" having "a complete absence of distinguished persons"); Burma;{China more from "a sense of duty than inclination" on a steamer, which she called a tea boat,; England (London); Europe; Iceland, between 1894 and 1897 where she founded a WCTU; India, where she noted the devotion of the Hindus and toured the Taj Mahal; Japan, including Hokkaido as well as Sakhalin and the Kuril Islands not long after the First Sino-Japanese War in 1894–95 (In 1906, she published an article in the Scottish Geographical Society about her visit to the Ainu people in which she expressed her concern about the tattooing done on the women, comparing it with the foot binding in China and noting that the Ainu women "share the fate of all the women of the East" by being far from equal with the men in spite of the fact that they did all the heavy work.'Of course, the men cheerfully aid by free advice and directions' she added ironically"); Java, where a journey to a temple was two hundred miles by slow rail; Kashmir; New Zealand, a place she said she would have chosen to live other than America; Siam, a place that was very difficult to reach at that time; the Sandwich Islands, where the Japanese Consul-General acted as her interpreter; Singapore, where she noted that "thirty different languages are spoken"; South Africa, en route to which, she climbed the mast in a divided skirt alongside the captain and another man.

== Writing ==
Ackermann's writings are said to "reveal a woman of wide interests who belongs in the company of nineteenth-century 'lady explorers'." Her three published books are:

- Ackermann, Jessie, The World through a Woman's Eyes (1896) Chicago
- Ackermann, Jessie, What Women Have Done with the Vote (1913) New York, W.B. Feakins
- Ackermann, Jessie, Australia from a woman's point of view (1913) Cassell & Co Ltd London, New York, Toronto, Melbourne ISBN 072690029X

== Recognition ==
In 1962 Ackermann was honoured by being made a memorial member of the World's WCTU. When working as the American Union's second world missionary, Ackermann particularly ensured that women's suffrage was high on the agenda and in the late twentieth century her contribution was acknowledged.
