= Annie Schnackenberg =

Prominent member of women's suffrage movement in New Zealand

Annie Jane Schnackenberg
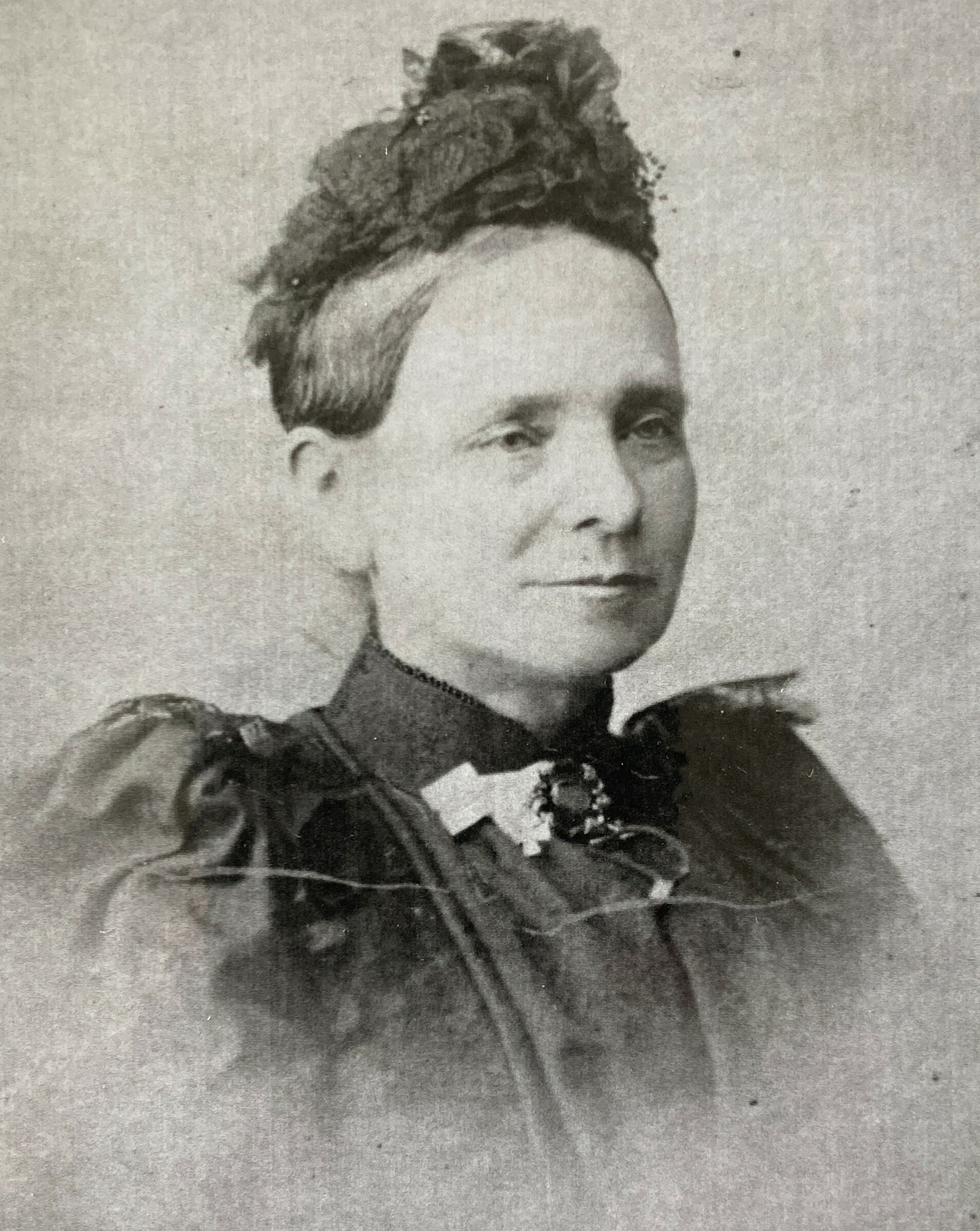
- Born: Annie Jane Allen; 22 November 1835; Leamington, Warwickshire, England
- Died: 2 May 1905 (aged 69); Morningside, Auckland, New Zealand
- Other names: Jenny
- Occupations: teacher, missionary
- Known for: missionary, temperance and suffrage activist
- Spouse: Cort Henry Schnackenberg (m. 1864)
- Parent(s): Elizabeth Dodd and Edward Allen

Annie Jane Schnackenberg (née Allen; 22 November 1835 – 2 May 1905) was a New Zealand Wesleyan missionary, temperance and welfare worker, and suffragist. She served as president of the Auckland branch of the Women's Christian Temperance Union New Zealand (WCTU NZ) 1887 to 1897, and national president for WCTU NZ from 1892 to 1901 – overseeing the final push for petitioning the government to grant women the right to vote in national elections. She also was a charter member of the National Council of Women of New Zealand.

== Early life ==
Annie Jane Allen was born in Leamington Priors, Warwickshire, England on 22 November 1835, the eldest daughter of Elizabeth Dodd (1808–1881) and Edward Allen (1811–1891). Edward owned a farm and, according to the 1861 England census, together with his wife ran a draper business. Annie Jane Allen was a milliner. Her younger siblings were Mary Elizabeth Allen Hooper (1837–1933), Thomas (1840–1925), Eliza Allen Pegler (1843–1921), Edward Allen Jr. (1846–1936), and John (1848–1921).

== Migration to New Zealand and missionary work ==
The family moved to New Zealand in 1861, travelling on the Black Eagle, and became pioneer farmers in the Mount Albert area of Auckland. Within days of her arrival, Annie signed up to teach in Wesleyan Mission schools on the west coast of the Waikato region at the mission station run by Rev. Cort Henry Schnackenberg (27 November 1812 – 10 August 1880). Eliza White, who had previously served at the Kawhia Mission, probably was part of her recruitment.

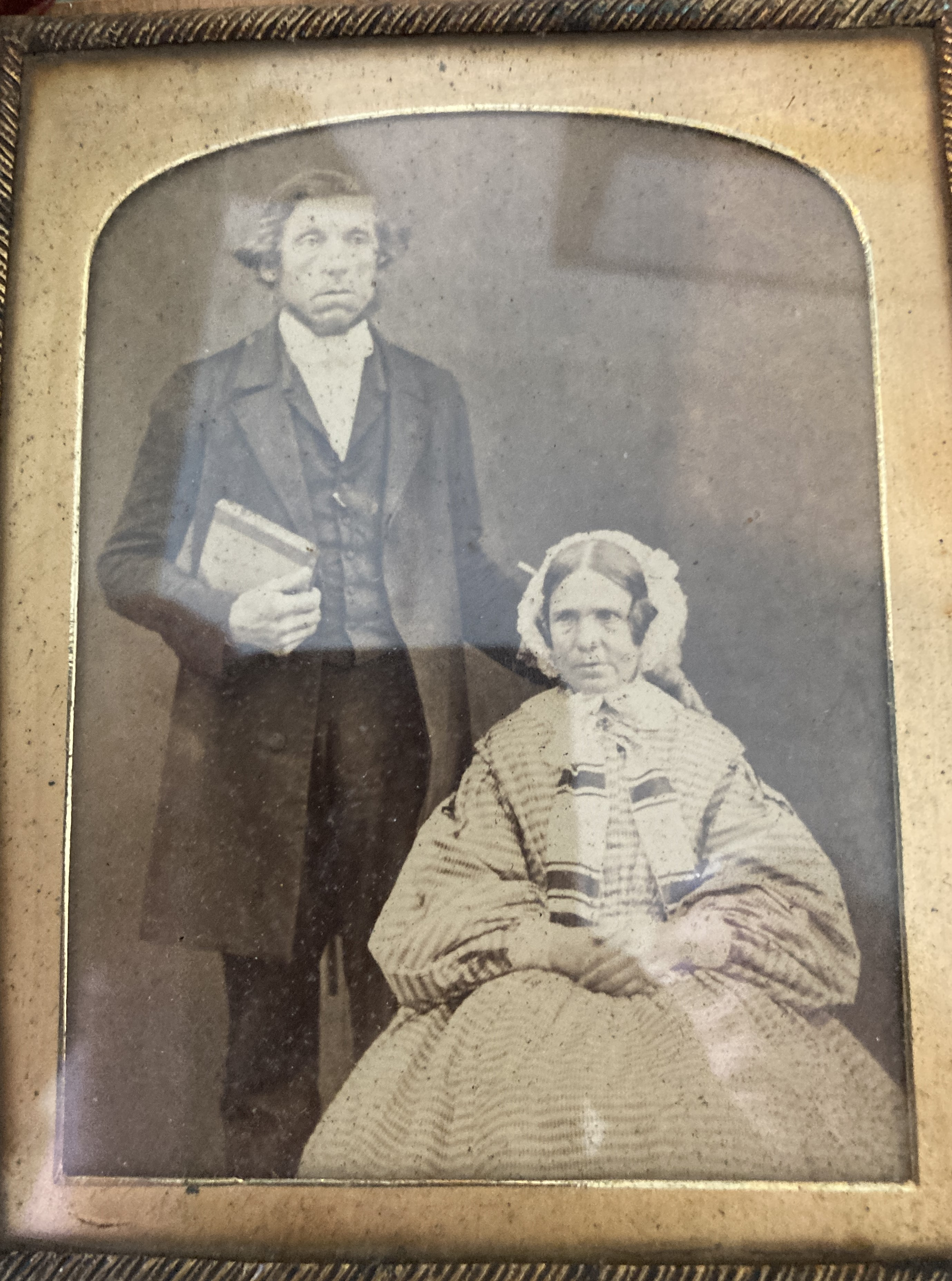
Cort Henry Schnackenberg with his first wife Amy Walsall Schnackenberg

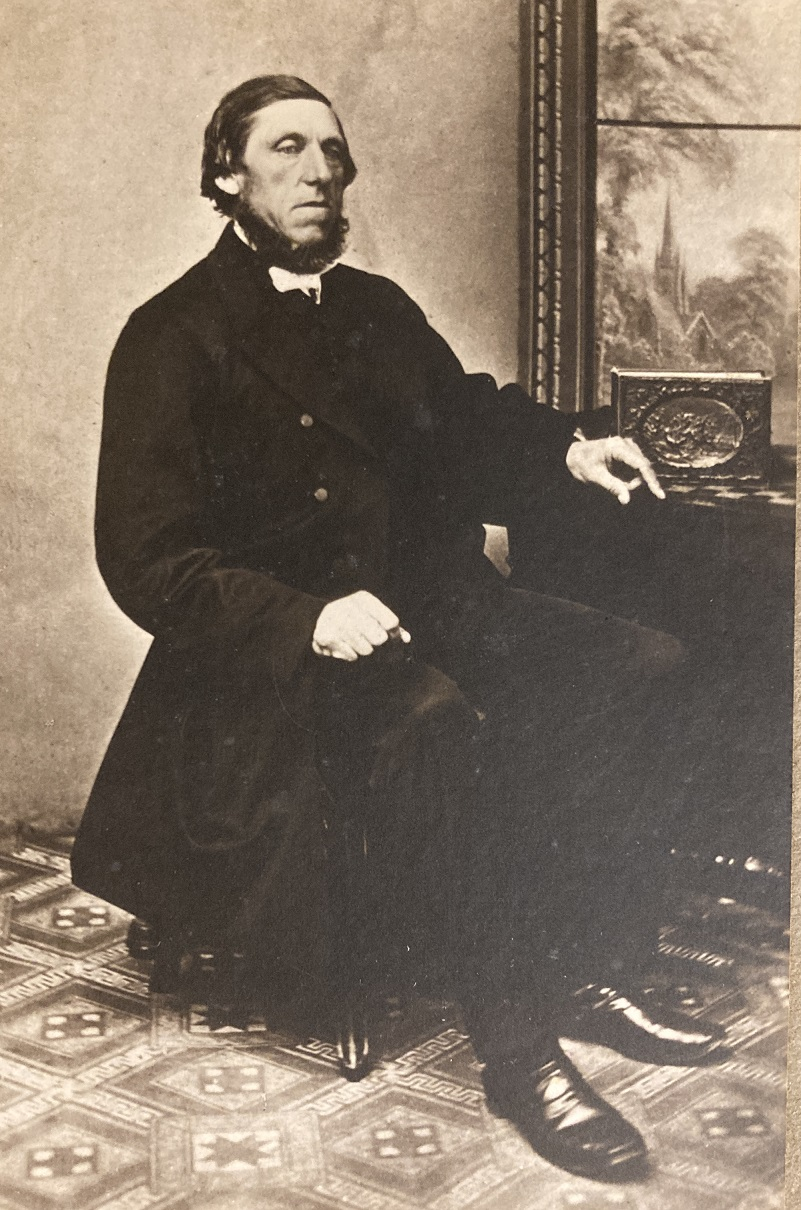
Rev. Cort H. Schnackenberg (1812–1880)

Allen set out for Kawhia in November 1861, a difficult journey by bullock dray, canoe and foot which took two weeks. At Kawhia, she assisted Cort Schnackenberg (born 1812) and his wife Amy to save and educate the Māori people. The Inspector of Native Schools praised her work. Amy died of breast cancer in August 1863, and Cort proposed to Annie Jane within months. They were married in Auckland on 12 May 1864. They had five children:

- Katrina Elizabeth (1865–1952), married 1890 John Edward Astley (1861–1962)
- Amy Isabel Mary (1867–1947)
- Edward Henry (1869–1953), married 1890 Elsie Jane Evelyn Allen (1876–1921), his first cousin
- Thomas Carl (1871–1953), married 1901 Amy Taylor (1877–1956)
- Lucy Jane (1872–1937), married 1899 Samuel Tatton Astley (1876–1956), John's younger brother

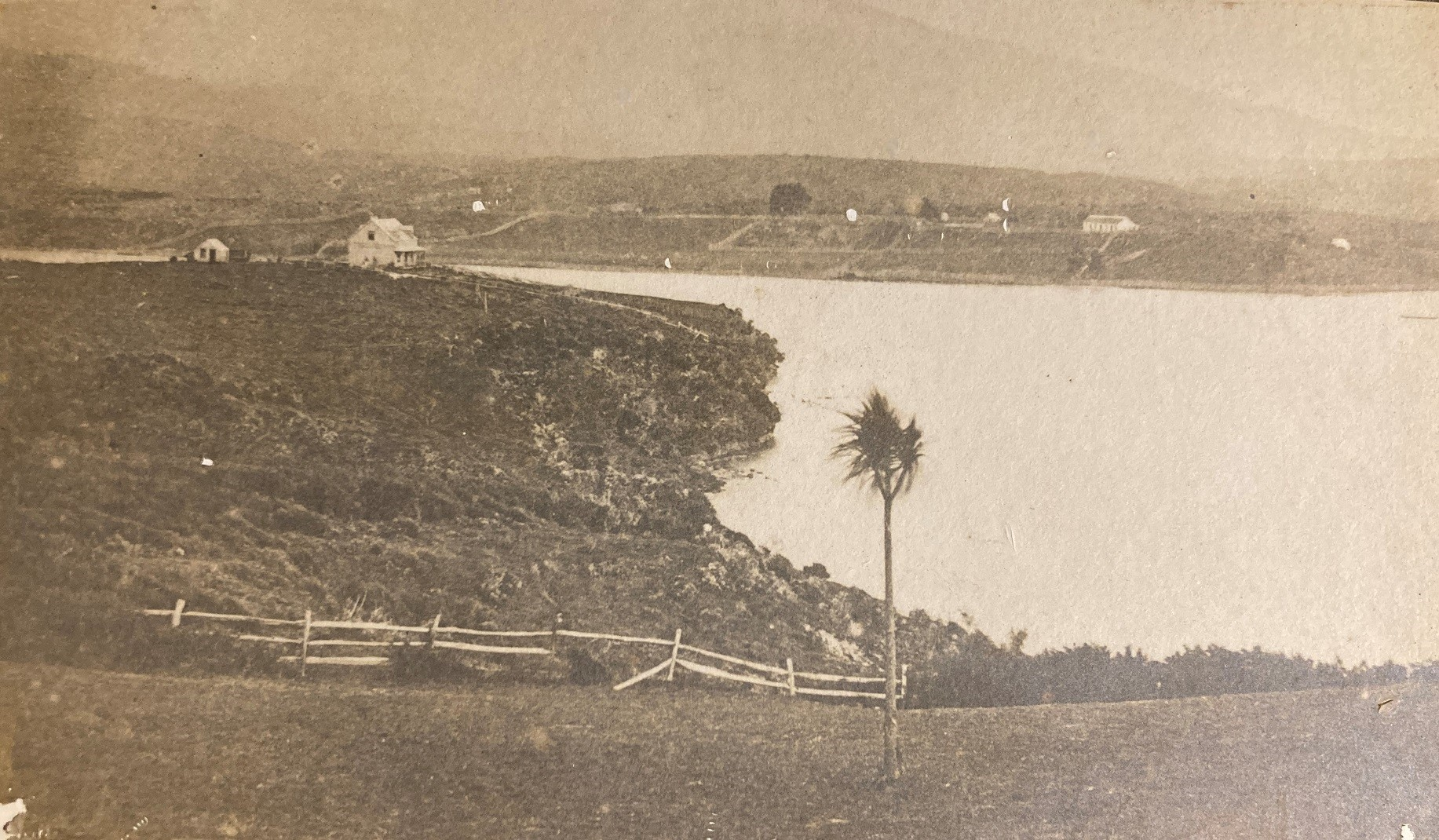
Raglan (Whāingaroa) Mission Station c1870s

From 1865 to 1872 they had three daughters and two sons. The Waikato War of 1863–1864 disrupted the mission's work, and a subsequent ban imposed by the Māori King Movement on European travel in the area decided the church authorities to move the mission further north to Raglan.

They remained at Raglan until Cort's health failed in 1880. He died on board ship travelling to Auckland. Annie returned to live at her family's farmhouse with her children.

== Activism ==
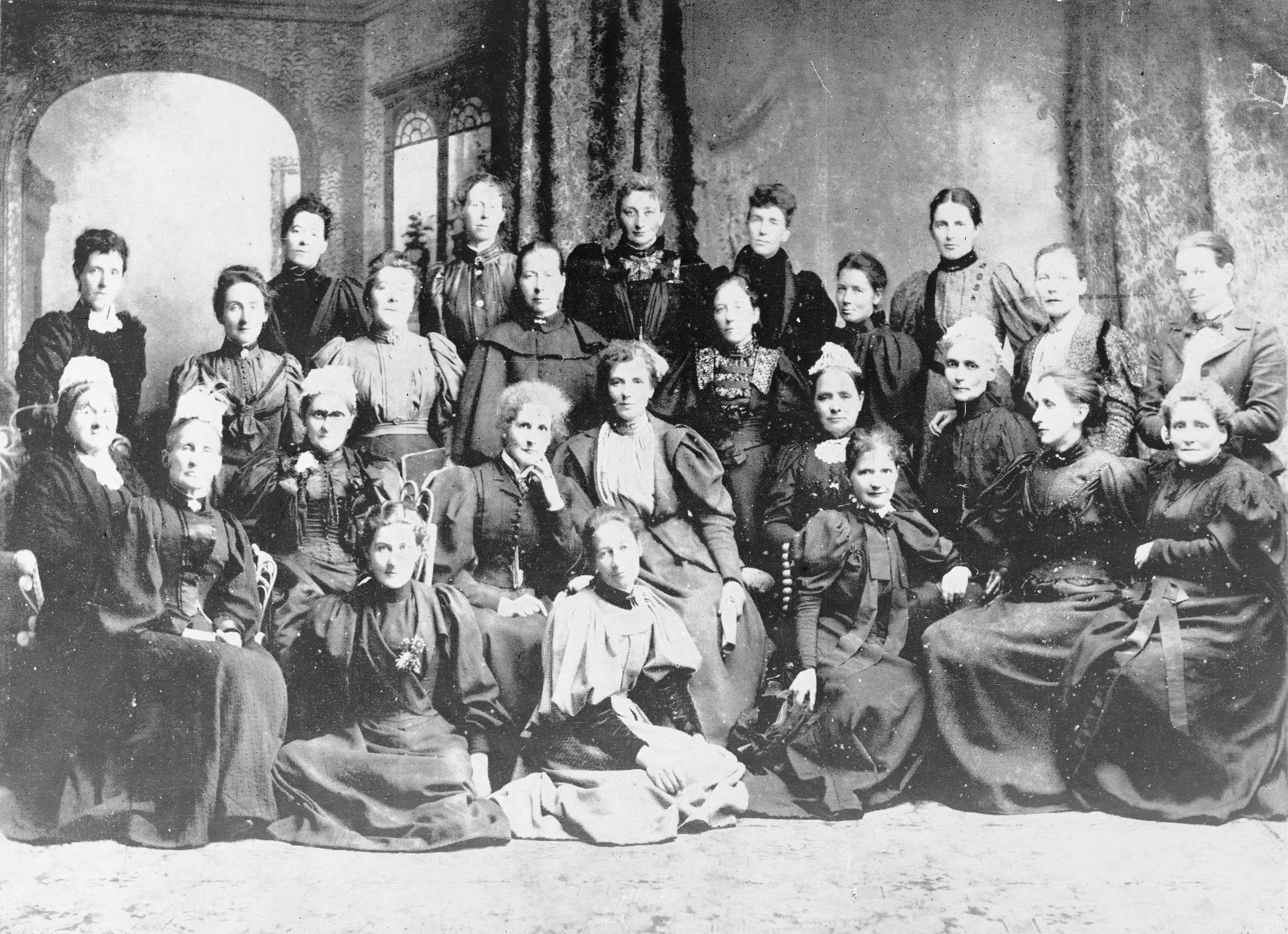
National Council of Women at the inaugural meeting in Christchurch in 1896, with Schnackenberg the fourth seated woman from the right (wearing white headgear)

Schnackenberg became active in local church affairs, and became a leader of the Pitt Street Methodist Church by 1882. During this time, she would have met Elizabeth Caradus and other women later active in social reform for women. She was a foundation member of the Auckland branch of the Women's Christian Temperance Union New Zealand (WCTU NZ) in 1885, serving as the superintendent of education. In January 1887, she was elected to the presidency of the Auckland branch, serving until 1897. She was appointed to the national superintendency of scientific temperance instruction in schools at the WCTU convention in March 1887. In March 1892 she was elected national president and served through 1901. Due to her extensive experience with Māori people and fluency in the language, she became the WCTU national superintendent of Maori work in 1898. She was also on the board of their publication, The White Ribbon.

The National Council of Women was formed in 1896. Schnackenberg represented the WCTU at the inaugural meeting in Christchurch, and was appointed a vice-president.

When women's suffrage was passed, Schnackenberg chaired a large celebratory public meeting in Auckland on 28 September 1893. A year later, she chaired a second meeting to report on progress made since the first.

Schnackenberg took strong moral positions in the defence of women. She advocated that temperance become a part of the school curriculum. She was unsuccessful in this, but the Department of Education did order temperance textbooks, making the teaching of temperance in schools possible. She campaigned for the age of consent to be raised to 21 "because it ought never to be possible for a girl or woman to consent to her own ruin". She opposed the Contagious Diseases Act 1869, which allowed prostitutes but not their clients to be detained for inspection and treatment of sexually transmitted diseases, because it made it safer for men to sin. She also opposed smoking tobacco and tattoos.

=== Other civic organisations ===
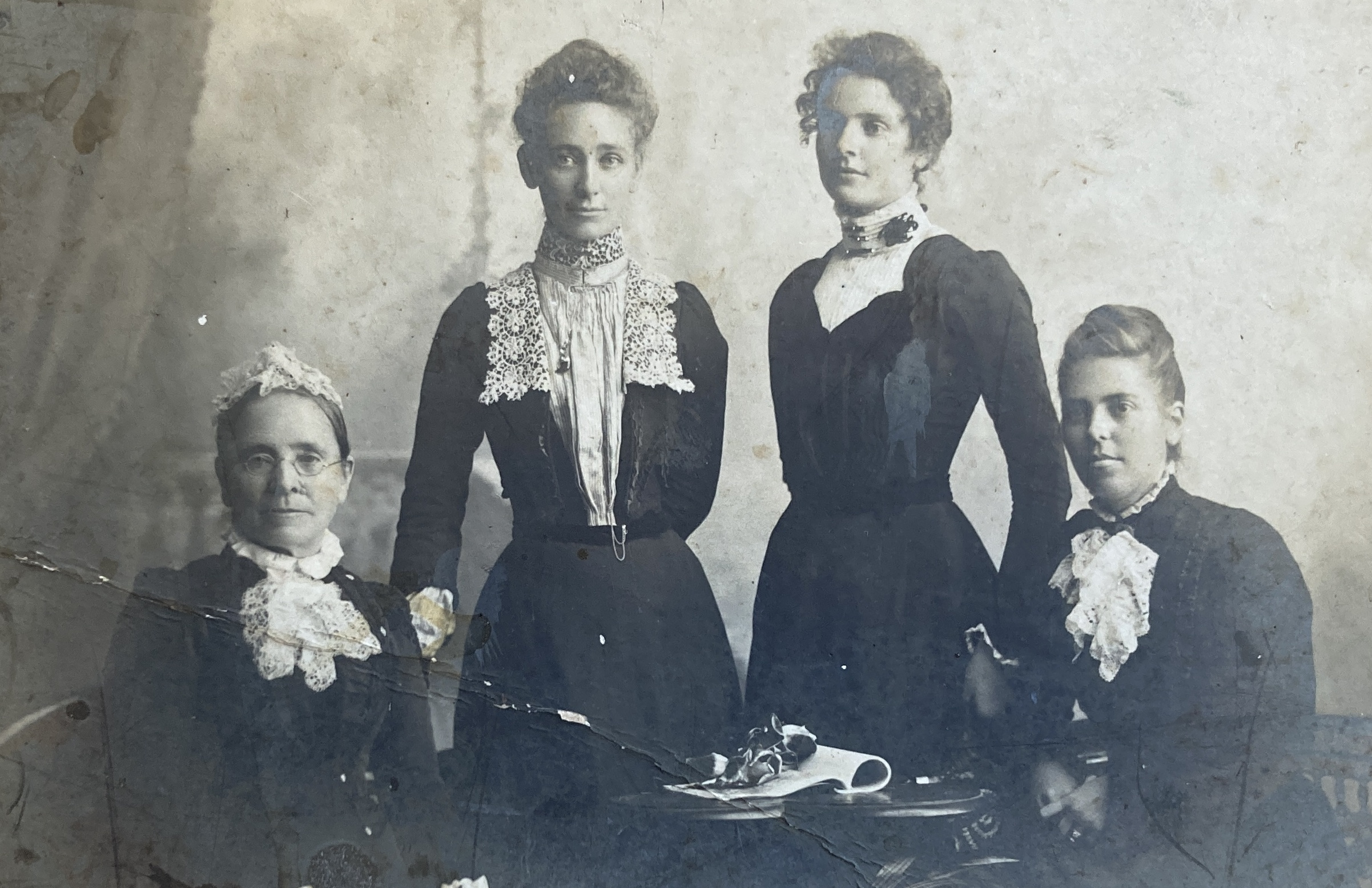
Annie Jane Allen Schnackenberg and her daughters c1896

Schnackenberg was a leader in many other civic organisations:

- Auckland Jubilee Kindergarten, subscriber, member of Ladies Committee and then president
- Auckland Prohibition and Temperance League
- Auckland Provincial Prohibition Council
- Auckland Tailoresses' Union
- Auckland Women's Franchise League (which morphed into the Auckland Women's Political League)
- Mt. Albert Total Abstinence Society
- New Zealand Alliance for the Suppression and Prohibition of the Liquor Traffic, Auckland chapter managing committee
- New Zealand Society for the Protection of Women and Children, Auckland chapter
- Young Women's Christian Association (WYCA) Auckland, vice-president and acting president for two years

== Death ==
She gave up presidency of the WCTU in 1901 as her health declined. She became more ill in 1903, and died on 2 May 1905. She was buried beside her husband in Symonds Street Cemetery.
