= Sarah Jane Kirk =

New Zealand temperance campaigner

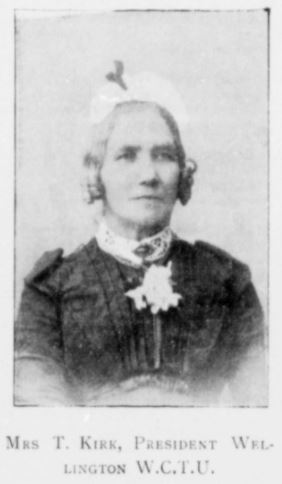
- Born: Sarah Jane Mattocks; 22 January 1829; Coventry, England
- Died: 15 January 1916 (aged 86); Wadestown, New Zealand
- Other names: Mrs. T. Kirk
- Occupations: leader in church and social clubs, including temperance, advocacy for the rights of women and children
- Known for: Humanitarian works and temperance leadership
- Spouse: Thomas Kirk m. 25 December 1850
- Children: Thomas William Kirk; Harry Kirk; Lily Atkinson; Cybele Kirk
- Parent(s): Mary and Joseph Mattocks

Sarah Jane Kirk (née Mattocks; 22 January 1829 – 15 January 1916) was a New Zealand temperance leader, suffragist and human rights activist. She served as president of the Wellington chapter of the Women's Christian Temperance Union New Zealand (WCTU NZ) for over a decade and served as one of the Union's national vice presidents.

== Early life and emigration to New Zealand ==
Sarah Jane Kirk was born in Warwickshire, England, on 22 January 1829, the eldest daughter of Mary Mattocks and a Coventry weaver/warehouseman Joseph Mattocks. Her brother Mark was three years younger, and two sisters (Mary and Emily) were nine and ten years younger respectively. She earned her living as a silk marker, and at the age of twenty-one, on Christmas Day 1850, she married Thomas Kirk, a bookkeeper in the local timber company.

In 1862 she emigrated with Thomas and their four children to New Zealand with four children – travelling 96 days at sea. Their first-born son died during the times of great poverty when they arrived in Auckland on 9 February 1863. She birthed another five children in New Zealand between 1864 and 1870, two of whom (twins) died as infants, and another daughter died aged 5 years old. Fresh off the boat, Thomas Kirk earned money by breaking stones at Mount Eden for building roads. By 1867 Thomas Kirk had begun his scientific explorations of the natural world, becoming well known for his specimen collections and writings on the botany of New Zealand. He served as a museum curator and taught botany at the Auckland College and Grammar School where his two sons, Thomas William Kirk and Harry Kirk, attended. There is not yet any documentation as to the education of their daughter, Amy Kirk, who went on to become a teacher and church worker. Perhaps she stayed home to help her mother through her pregnancies and deaths of three children. Lily May and Cybele Ethel were born while the family was living in Auckland.

== Leadership in Wellington: church and women's clubs ==
In 1874, the Kirk family moved to Wellington where Thomas Kirk was hired as a professor natural sciences at Wellington College. There was no running water in the Kirk family's little cottage on Tinakori Road, and for some time they carried water from the home of New Zealand's Premier, Sir Julius Vogel, across the road. She enrolled her younger daughters, Lily May and Cybele in the nearby Greenwood Terrace school for girls run by activist sisters Ellen, Mary and Annie Greenwood. Despite the hard work of maintaining a large family and with a husband often absent on research trips, Kirk began crafting her role of church and civic engagement.

=== Vivian Street Baptist Church ===
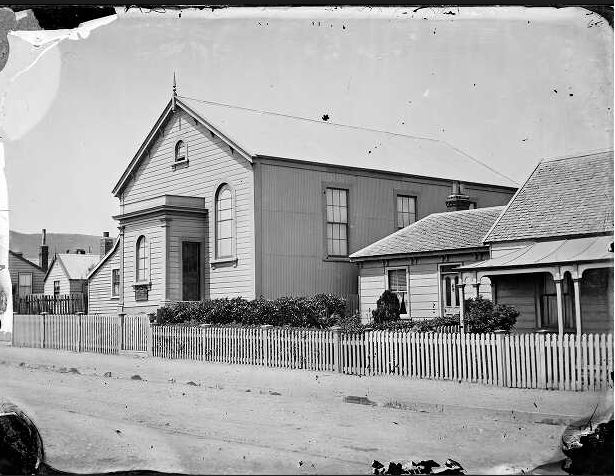
Vivian Street Baptist Church, Wellington, New Zealand – Rev. Josiah Taylor Hinton, pastor

Many of the New Zealand Company's earliest settlers identified themselves as part of religions independent from the Church of England, and the first Baptist churches organised as early as 1851. From the beginning New Zealand's Baptist women took active roles in prayer meetings and serving as missionary evangelists. So when the call went out to form a Baptist church in Wellington, Kirk as a member of the first congregation of nineteen that came together on 20 January 1878. The important task of fundraising undertaken by the Baptist women produced the first Baptist Church in Wellington, which opened on Vivian Street in December 1879.

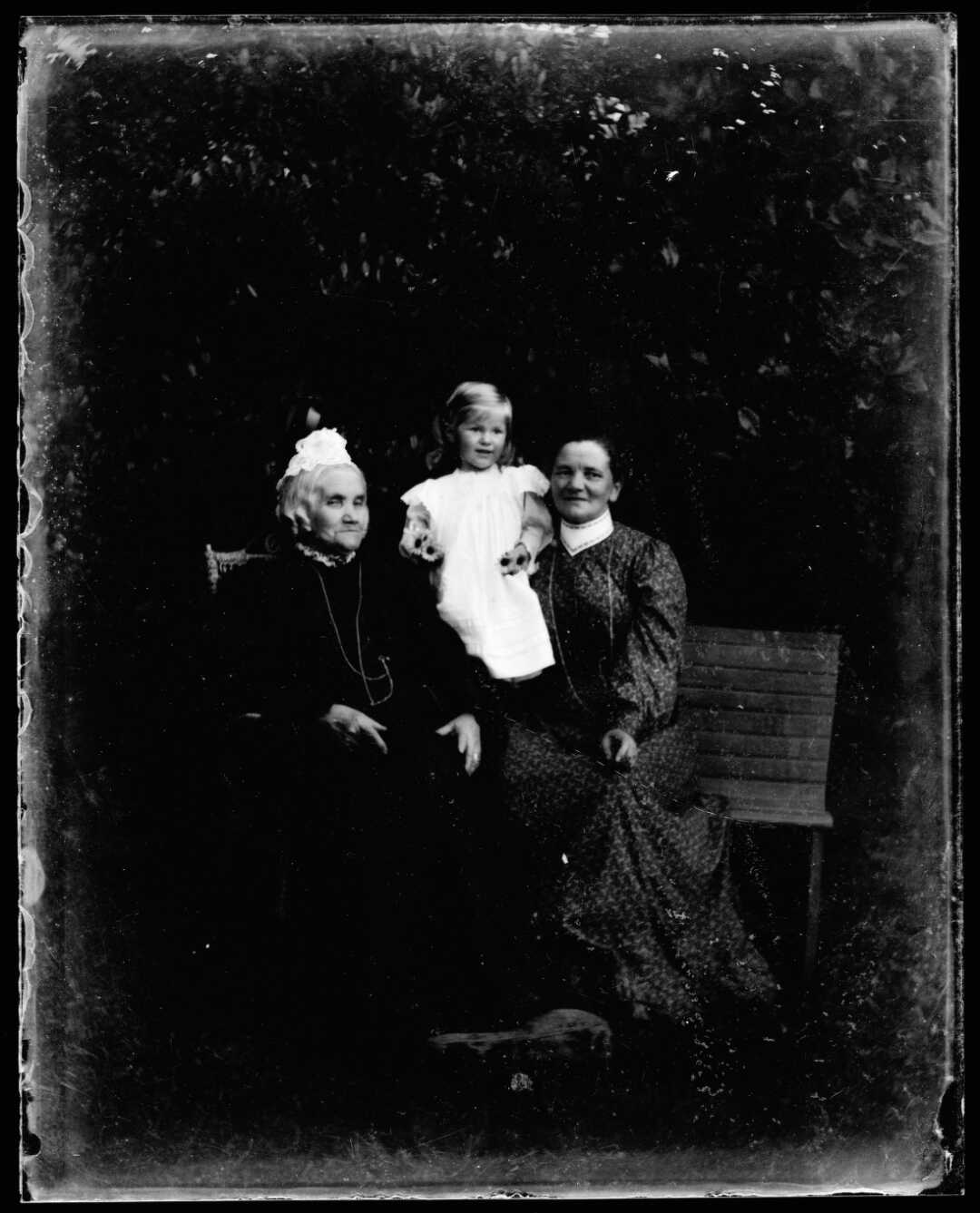
Sarah Jane Kirk, Janet Atkinson (daughter of Lily May), and Amy Kirk c. 1907

Those early years of the Vivian Street Baptist Church were strongly influenced by the Rev. Josiah Taylor Hinton, a strong temperance evangelist. The Kirk women contributed regularly to outreach missionary work for the church, and the eldest daughter Amy served as a Sunday School teacher for over thirty years. Amy Kirk, living with her mother and never marrying, also served as an appointed visitor to the Wellington Hospital by the Wellington Hospital Charitable Aid Board, bringing her Baptist convictions and WCTU principles with her.

=== Wellington Ladies' Christian Association ===
Kirk, together with Ellen Greenwood, was an early member of the Wellington Ladies' Christian Association, a combined effort of churchwomen to support immigrant women, manage poor relief efforts, support women in jail, and evangelism. One year after the founding of the club in 1878, the group began the Alexandra Nursing home. Only a few years later, the group opened in 1881 a Home for Destitute and Friendless Women in Hanson Street, Newtown, a working-class area on the southern outskirts of Wellington. For a few months, the group also sponsored a Female Refuge on Nairn Street with a managing committee led by Lady Elizabeth Jervois, the Governor's wife.

=== Leadership in Women's Christian Temperance Union of New Zealand ===
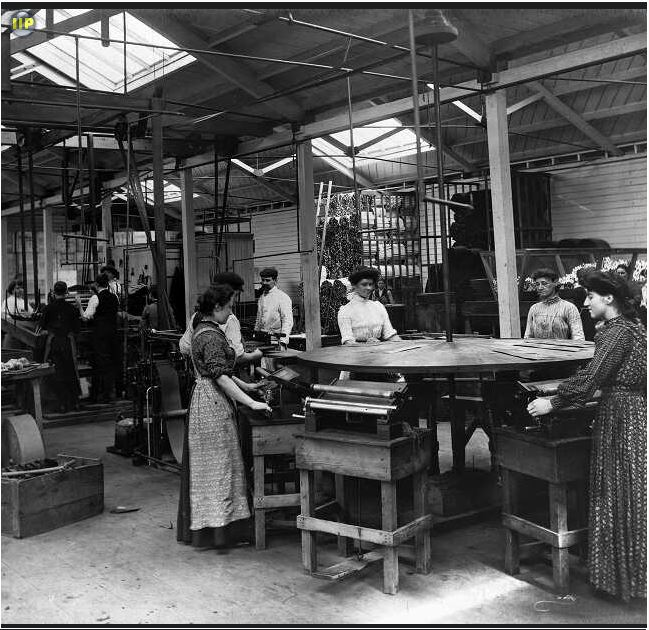
Workers at R. Bell & Co. Match Factory in Newtown, Wellington, NZ c1906

Kirk's work with the Wellington Ladies' Christian Association connected well with the goals of the Women's Christian Temperance Union of New Zealand (WCTU NZ). She was elected president of the Wellington chapter of the WCTU NZ on 7 February 1895, a position she kept for nearly a decade. She also served as a member of the WCTU NZ White Ribbon committee and also served as one of the Vice Presidents of the WCTU NZ. During her presidency, the Wellington Union members regularly visited the Convalescent Home and the Home for the Aged Needy and offered a singing band to entertain the elderly pensioners. Kirk also organised classes for young working girls, teaching them to read and write as well as the domestic sciences. She got furniture and a piano donated for a room where the girls could gather for social events, Bible study and meetings. The Wellington Union members would visit the girls in their homes if needed to keep them connected to the club. They also would bring WCTU meetings directly to girls working in the R. Bell & Co. Match Factory on Riddiford Street in Newtown. Kirk's business acumen was touted for having acquired a building for their Newtown Girls' Association.

In 1901 Kirk's Union hosted the national convention in Wellington. Her welcome speech included a reference to the British military recruitment of New Zealanders in the war in South Africa: "Like Lord Kitchener, the Union wanted Contingents in New Zealand, not wearers of khaki, but of the White Ribbon. Every woman should feel her responsibility." During her presidency, the Wellington Union regularly reported some of the highest Union chapter membership numbers, second only to Auckland or Dunedin. She refused re-election in 1904 at the age of 73. The Union presented to her a parting gift of a travelling clock, writing case and a pair of butter forks.

Kirk did not retire from her temperance evangelism completely. In 1906 she wrote a letter to the editor of the WCTU NZ White Ribbon encouraging the membership to support the No-License referendum of 1908.

"I feel strongly that the members of the W.C.T.U. and all Christians must be more alert in keeping the telephone between earth and heaven in more constant use than has been the case in the past. If we 'ring up' oftener the Poll of 1908 will be a gratifying one for all New Zealand. May we never forget our strength is in God, and may we ring up constantly."

In 1912 Kirk participated in a Wellington South WCTU meeting on "White Ribbon Day" by pinning a white ribbon on a new recruit.

== Death ==
Kirk continued her church work at the Vivian Street Baptist Church, including the management of distributing boxes of clothing for the Crutch and Kindness League of the Ragged School Union.

She suffered a sudden heart attack just before Christmas in 1916, then again on the day after. On Saturday, 15 January 1916, Sarah Jane Kirk died at her residence at 30 Pirie Street in Wellington, New Zealand. She was buried on 17 January 1916 in the Karori Cemetery Plot 3K which she had bought for her husband's grave upon his death in 1898.

== See also ==
- Temperance movement in New Zealand
- Women's Christian Temperance Union New Zealand
- 1894–1987 New Zealand alcohol licensing referendums
