= Ranunculus foliosus =

Scientific classification
- Kingdom: Plantae
- Clade: Tracheophytes
- Clade: Angiosperms
- Clade: Eudicots
- Order: Ranunculales
- Family: Ranunculaceae
- Genus: Ranunculus
- Species: R. foliosus

Binomial name
- Ranunculus foliosus Kirk

Synonyms
- Ranunculus insertus G.Simpson; Ranunculus subscaposus var. canterburiensis J.B.Armstr.; Ranunculus appaceus var. villosus Kirk; Ranunculus porrectus G.Simpson

Species of flowering plant

Ranunculus foliosus is a species of flowering plant in the buttercup family, Ranunculaceae, endemic to New Zealand.
