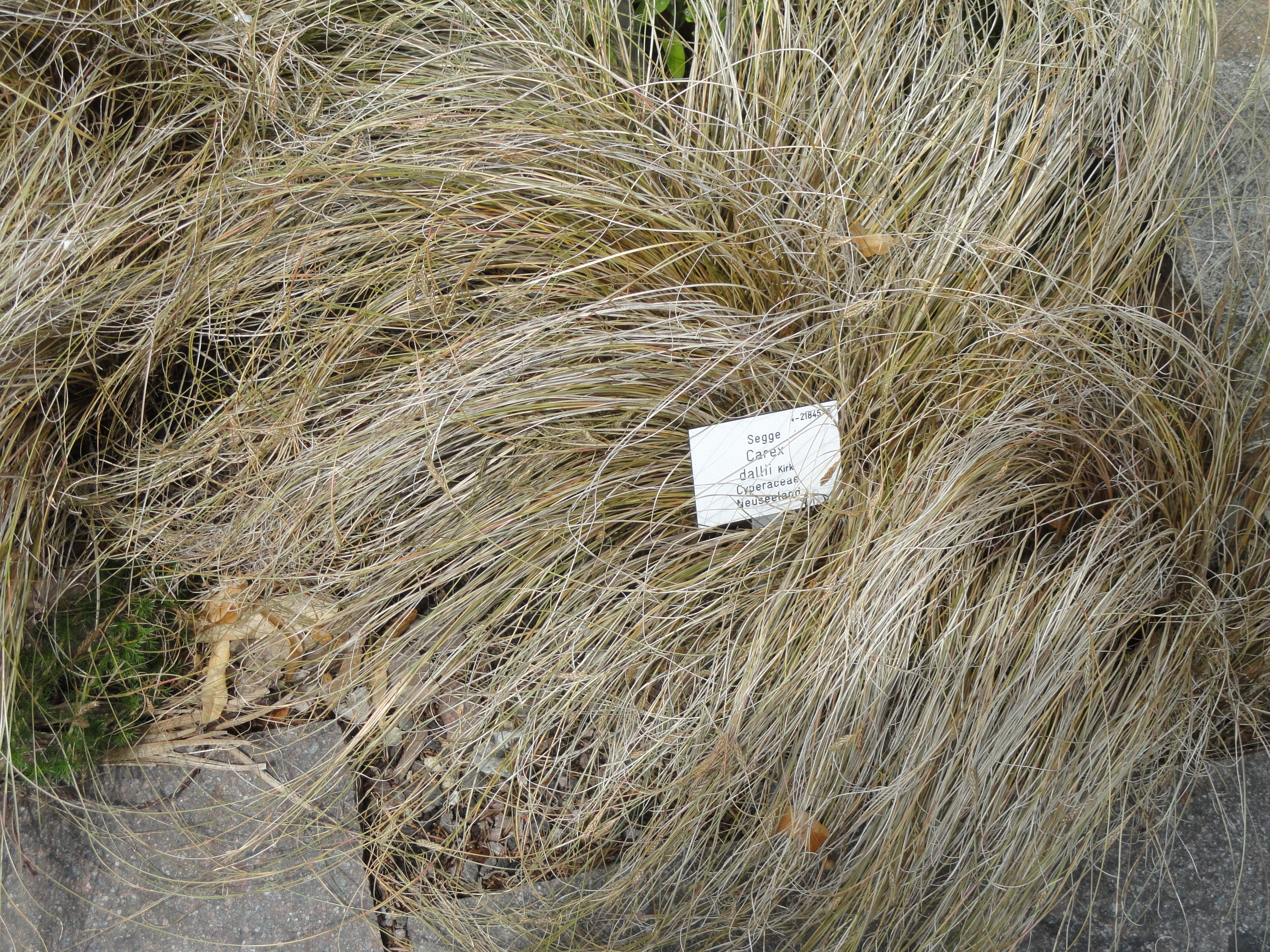

Scientific classification
- Kingdom: Plantae
- Clade: Tracheophytes
- Clade: Angiosperms
- Clade: Monocots
- Clade: Commelinids
- Order: Poales
- Family: Cyperaceae
- Genus: Carex
- Species: C. dallii

Binomial name
- Carex dallii Kirk

= Carex dallii =

Species of grass-like plant

Carex dallii is an uncommon species of sedge native to the South Island (North West Nelson, Westland and Otago) of New Zealand. Its culms are approximately 500×0.5 mm when mature, and rhizomes are about 1 mm diameter.
