= Ranunculus cheesemanii =

Scientific classification
- Kingdom: Plantae
- Clade: Tracheophytes
- Clade: Angiosperms
- Clade: Eudicots
- Order: Ranunculales
- Family: Ranunculaceae
- Genus: Ranunculus
- Species: R. cheesemanii

Binomial name
- Ranunculus cheesemanii Kirk

Species of flowering plant

Ranunculus cheesemanii is a species of flowering plant in the buttercup family, Ranunculaceae, endemic to New Zealand.
