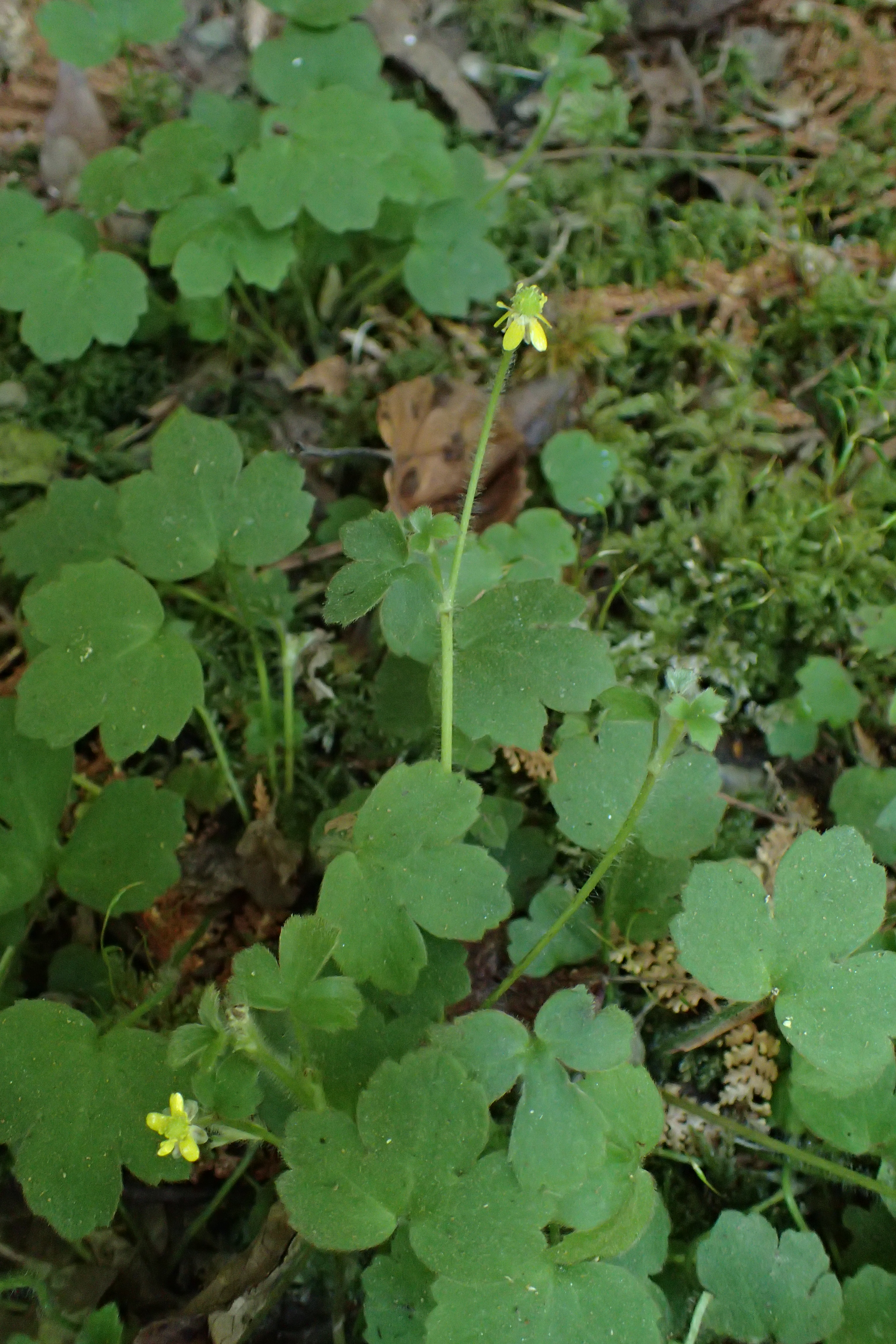

Scientific classification
- Kingdom: Plantae
- Clade: Tracheophytes
- Clade: Angiosperms
- Clade: Eudicots
- Order: Ranunculales
- Family: Ranunculaceae
- Genus: Ranunculus
- Species: R. reflexus

Binomial name
- Ranunculus reflexus Garn.-Jones

= Ranunculus reflexus =

Species of plant

Ranunculus reflexus, the hairy buttercup, maru, maruru, kopukapuka, or pirikau, is a species of buttercup.

Phil Garnock-Jones described the species in 1987, as the first legitimate description of what was previously known as Ranunculus hirtus.

Ranunculus reflexus inhabits damp and shaded understories, and is found at all elevations below the bushline. It is not threatened.

Trifoliolate leaf arrangement

Maruru has hairy trilobed to trifoliolate basal leaves, and is distinguished from the morphologically similar Ranunculus membranifolius by the absence of rhizomes.

Ranunculus reflexus is a known polyploid (hexaploid; 2n = 48).

== Range ==
Endemic to Aotearoa New Zealand, found throughout the North and South Islands, Rakiura Stewart Island, Rēkohu Chatham Islands, and the sub-Antarctic Islands.
