= Harry Kirk (biologist) =

New Zealand biologist, university professor and school inspector (1859–1948)

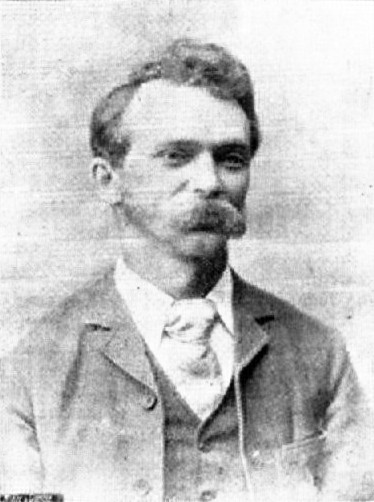
- Kirk, c. 1897
- Born: Harry Borrer Kirk; 9 March 1859; Coventry, Warwickshire, England
- Died: 15 July 1948 (aged 89); Hamilton, New Zealand
- Occupations: Government school inspector, biology professor
- Spouse: Annie Lamont Kirk (m. 1885; died 1927)
- Children: 2
- Relatives: Sarah Jane Mattocks (mother); Thomas Kirk (father); Thomas William Kirk (brother); Lily May Kirk Atkinson (sister); Cybele Kirk (sister)

Harry Borrer Kirk (9 March 1859 – 15 July 1948) was a New Zealand school inspector, biologist and university professor.

== Public life ==
He was born in Coventry, Warwickshire, England on 9 March 1859 to Sarah Jane Mattocks and Thomas Kirk. The family emigrated to New Zealand arriving in Auckland on 9 February 1863 and Wellington in 1874 when Thomas Kirk was appointed to Wellington College. Harry studied for University of New Zealand exams at home, gaining a BA in 1882 and a MA 1883, after which he joined the Department of Education first as a clerk and then as an inspector of native schools. As an inspector, he spend almost two decades traveling the country, collecting botanical specimens as he went.

As was typical at the time, Kirk saw Pākehā education as a force for 'elevating' Māori. The 1880 Native Schools Code held that te reo Māori was only to be used to 'learn English more effectively' and Kirk stated in a report:

I think the teacher should cease to use Maori in school when the necessary explanation can be made in English. It is quite likely that the children will readily understand instruction given in Maori and that they will make the greater progress in certain subjects, such as Writing and Arithmetic, but they will not trouble themselves to understand English if the teacher will speak Maori. It is to be borne in mind that English is not only an important subject in itself but that it is a 'key' subject to others.

— Harry Borrer Kirk, The Provision of Education Services to East Coast Maori. John Barrington, August 2007. quote taken from 'Inspection Report, Tikitiki, 15 March 1889.BAAA 1001/640c. ANZ-A. DB.'

In 1903 Kirk was appointed inaugural chair of biology to Victoria College (now Victoria University of Wellington) and he largely devoted the rest of his life to building up the biology capabilities of the university.

During the First World War he produced several innovations in military camps for to reduce fly contamination, and he is said to have refused a Captain's commission.

== Family life ==
Kirk married Annie Lamont (or La Monte) on 10 July 1885 in Dunedin. They had two children Ethelwin Gladys Kirk (died 1957) and Hilda Gyneth Hall (died 1973), both of whom are buried in Karori Cemetery next to Kirk's parents. His wife Annie died in March 1927. After he retired in 1944, he was cared for by his unmarried sister Cybele Kirk, who had been active, along with their sister Lily May Kirk, in the women's suffrage movement. The family were active in the Baptist Union of New Zealand, with Harry being a listed as a Mortgagee in the Baptist Union Incorporation Act 1923

== Death ==
Kirk died at Waikato Hospital in Hamilton on 15 July 1948. He had been at Tauranga with leg fracture which did not heal properly.

== Legacy ==
Two buildings on the Kelburn campus of Victoria University of Wellington are named after Kirk, called the Kirk Building and the Old Kirk Building.

== Positions ==
- Original fellow of the New Zealand Institute (renamed the Royal Society of New Zealand after the royal charter) 1919
- President of the Wellington Philosophical Society in 1907–1908
- President of the New Zealand Institute in 1922–23
- Founding member of the University Reform Association
- Senate of the University of New Zealand 1915 to 1920
- Academic board of the University of New Zealand 1930 to 1944
- chairman of the Committee of Management of the Dominion Museum (new Museum of New Zealand Te Papa Tongarewa)
