= Ranunculus ternatifolius =

- R. ternatifolius in northwest Nelson, South Island

Scientific classification
- Kingdom: Plantae
- Clade: Tracheophytes
- Clade: Angiosperms
- Clade: Eudicots
- Order: Ranunculales
- Family: Ranunculaceae
- Genus: Ranunculus
- Species: R. ternatifolius

Binomial name
- Ranunculus ternatifolius Kirk

Species of flowering plant

Ranunculus ternatifolius is a species of flowering plant in the buttercup family, Ranunculaceae, endemic to New Zealand. It is a perennial plant originally described by New Zealand botanist Thomas Kirk.
