= Cybele Kirk =

New Zealand temperance and welfare worker, suffragist and teacher

Cybele Ethel Kirk
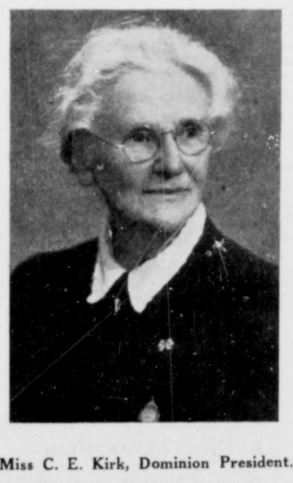
- Born: 1 October 1870; Auckland
- Died: 19 May 1957 (aged 86); Wellington
- Known for: humanitarian works and temperance activism
- Parent(s): Sarah Jane Mattocks and Thomas Kirk
- Relatives: sisters Amy Kirk and Lily May Kirk Atkinson; and, brothers Harry Borrer Kirk and Thomas William Kirk

Cybele Ethel Kirk (1 October 1870 – 19 May 1957) was a New Zealand temperance and welfare worker, suffragist, and teacher. Kirk was one of the first women appointed Justice of the Peace in New Zealand. After serving for many years as president of the Wellington chapter of the Women's Christian Temperance Union of New Zealand (WCTU NZ), she was elected in 1930 as the national Union's recording secretary. She simultaneously served as president of the National Council of Women of New Zealand from 1934 to 1937. She was elected president of the WCTU NZ in 1946, serving in that role through 1949.

== Early life ==
Kirk was born in Auckland in New Zealand on 1 October 1870. Her parents were Sarah Jane and Thomas Kirk. Her father was an enthusiastic botanist who was a museum curator who later lectured on the natural sciences at Wellington College. She was one of nine children and five, including Thomas, Harry and Lily, who survived to adulthood. She used the name, Cybele, as a child but used, Ethel, in later life. When she was three her family moved to Wellington as her father continued his career in Botany. She, her sisters and her mother assisted her father by gathering plants.

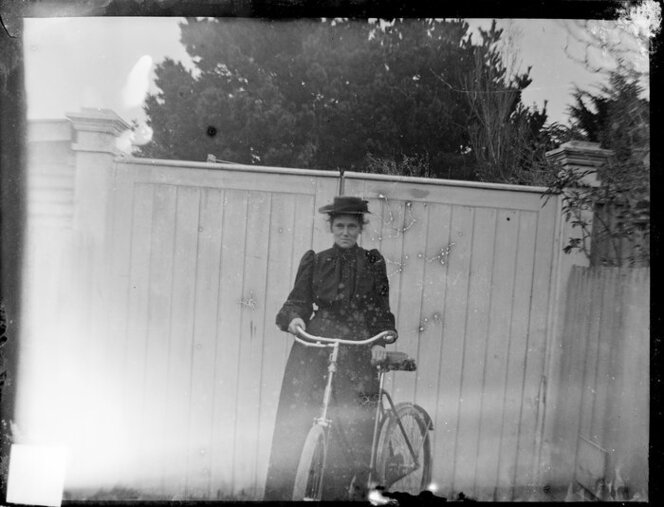
Cybele Ethel Kirk and bicycle, symbol of women's rights, in 1890s Wellington NZ

Her mother Sarah Jane Kirk was a leader in the Wellington Christian Ladies' Association and the Wellington chapter of the Women's Christian Temperance Union New Zealand; and she encouraged her three daughters to participate in these organizations as they worked to support impoverished families and victims of domestic violence. However, when Cybele was singled out to serve as an officer in the Society for the Protection of Women and Children, a new organization started up by her sister Lily, Sarah Jane protested as she thought the work to be too difficult for the delicate nature of Cybele's health at the time.

In 1893, Cybele Kirk was one of over 30,000 women who signed the petition for the New Zealand Parliament to extend political franchise to women. At that time she lived on Brougham Street in Mt. Victoria, Wellington.

In 1898 her father Thomas Kirk died, and Cybele directed her Sunday School teacher skills to obtaining paid work teaching in a primary school. She was interested in the work and in 1905 she co-founded the Richmond Free Kindergarten Union.

== Humanitarian Activism ==
Her mother died in 1916 and she moved to Riverbank Road in Ōtaki, where she got a job teaching at the Ōtaki Maori Boys College. In 1918 she worked through the flu epidemic, organised and ran an Emergency Hospital of 30 beds with only voluntary help. She stayed at the college until 1921. Her sister, Lily, died that year, and Kirk went on to be the secretary of the New Zealand Society for the Protection of Women and Children in 1924. She kept this post until 1937 looking after abandoned and unwed mothers and those affected by alcoholism. Cybele was very popular among the women who were served by the society. As reported in The White Ribbon: "When she takes her holiday, the members of Committee, who attend to the office and visiting are constantly met with this plaint: 'Isn't Miss Kirk here?' or 'I thought Miss Kirk would come to see me.'"

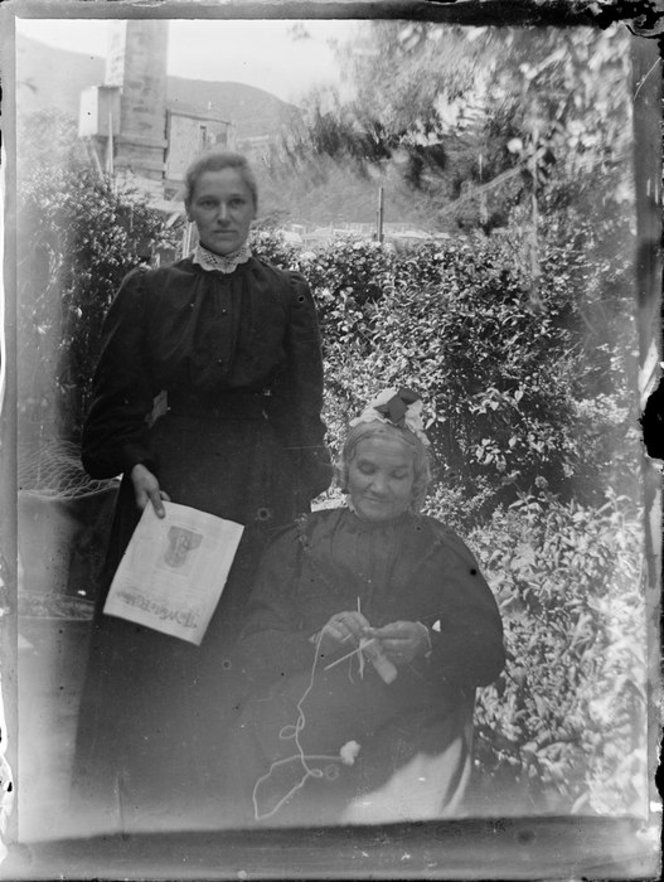
Cybele holding Oct 1898 issue of The White Ribbon next to her mother Sarah Jane Kirk

== Women's Christian Temperance Union of New Zealand ==
Kirk served for many years as secretary of the Wellington WCTU from the mid-1890s, often helping her mother Sarah Jane Kirk and sister Lily May Kirk Atkinson in temperance evangelism around Wellington and along the west coast of New Zealand. For example, in 1897 Lily formed a Union branch at Petone, focusing on a Girl's Sewing Guild. Cybele Kirk followed up later that year with a visit to Petone to help with organizational meeting ideas to help with recruitment and dissemination of temperance literature.

By 1903 Kirk was the national superintendent of the Narcotics department of the Women's Christian Temperance Union of New Zealand (WCTU NZ), emphasizing the need for additional literature about the debiliatory effects of tobacco. She was particularly worried about the rates of smoking among young children. In giving her report at the national convention that year she "demonstrated her own methods of procedure when winning small boys from the use of the forbidden cigarette."

In 1930 while living in Karori, a suburb of Wellington, and continuing to serve as president of the Wellington Union, Kirk was elected as the new recording secretary of the national WCTU NZ. She began lobbying politicians on behalf of unemployed women. For example, in 1931 she participated in a National Council of Women of New Zealand deputation petitioning the Hon. J.G. Coates to provide government-funded employment, stating that she "knew personally of many mothers, with their children, who were stinted in food and short of necessaries of life." She also worked on behalf of the Wellington WCTU, together with Nellie Jane Peryman to petition the Minister of Justice to close the Courts to the public when cases of maintenance, separation and affiliation were being heard. Kirk explained: "Young women are forced to tell intimate details before a crowd of idle, curious men, then the girl is a marked character, and often is followed from the Court by one of the idlers, and her position becomes worse than ever."

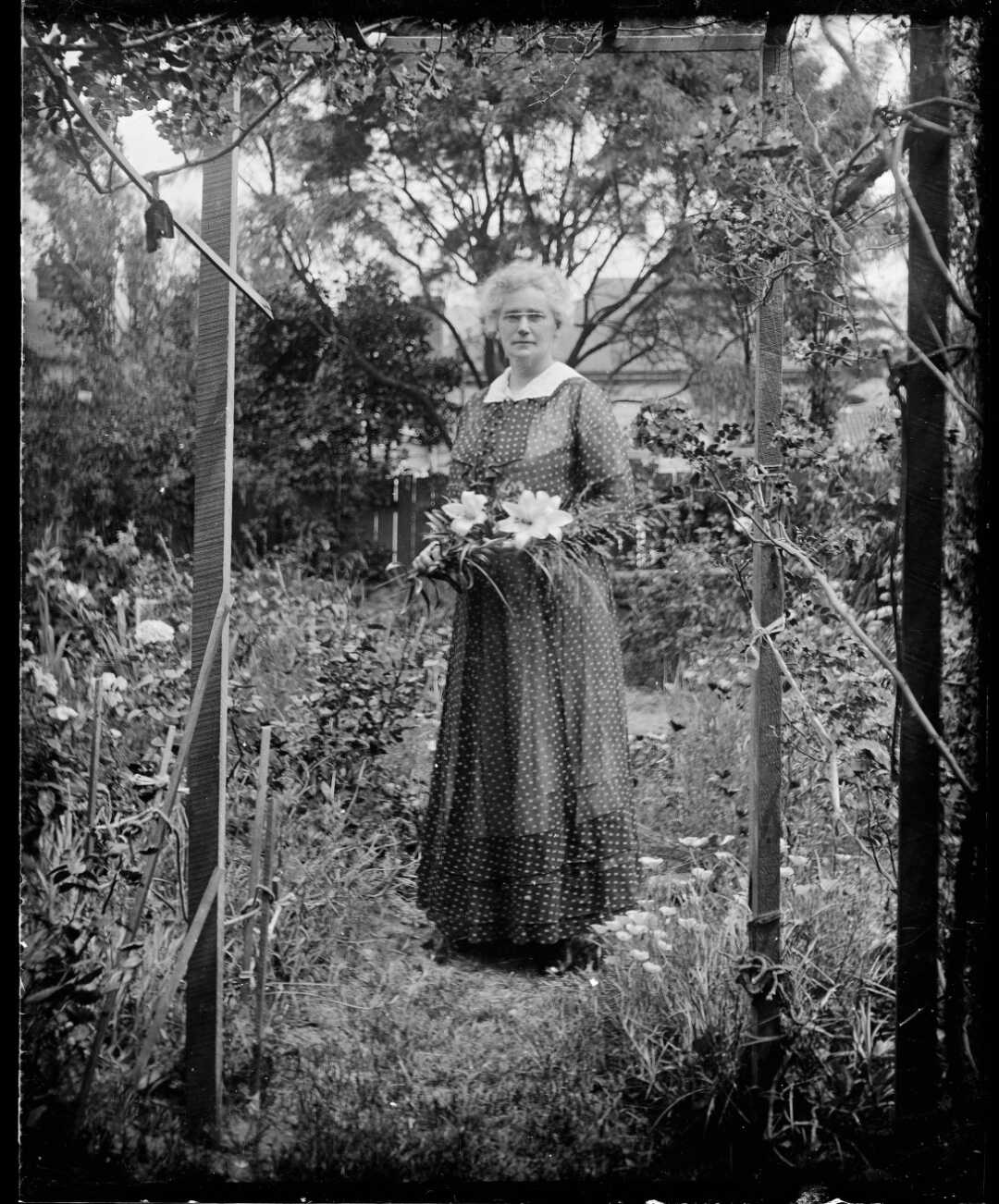
Cybele Kirk in her fifties

Kirk served as the superintendent of the WCTU NZ Social and Moral Hygiene Department and connected temperance with the dangers of unprotected sex. "Teach your children plainly and simply the effects of alcohol consumption, and teach them also the value and sacredness of their bodies; giving them truthful answers to questions as they are asked." She pushed for women's rights even in the face of popular fears of returning soldiers bringing venereal diseases back home to their wives. Kirk argued that any man "whose moral sense is scanty" could report a woman to the police who would then force her to be examined. Under the Venereal Diseases Regulations 1941, the government began using the first official contact tracers, and people could be compulsorily tested and treated for venereal disease.

At the 1946 WCTU NZ convention in Christchurch, Kirk was elected president. She was a popular leader, serving in this role through 1949.

Who, having watched and listened to her in Conventions, can forget the note of humour so skilfully used when discussions grew tedious, or feeling ran high. Real wit, and a happy knack of felicitous expression, caused all hearers to listen with a new look of expectation on their faces when Miss Kirk rose, and with a very charming courtesy, said just the very thing which would clear the air; bring to the tiring debate just the bit of information which was wanting; and a rustle of laughter would be heard all through the hall.

After her stint as president, she continued to work for the WCTU NZ. She would stand in for the current president when needed, for example in 1951 she represented the WCTU NZ President at a National Council of Women conference in Christchurch, and then again at a Pan-Pacific Conference the following year.

== National Council of Women of New Zealand ==
Cybile Kirk served as president of the National Council of Women of New Zealand (NCWNZ) from 1934 to 1937, one three-year term. Her aim was to "reassert women's rights to paid employment." In 1934 represented New Zealand at the International Council of Women conference in Melbourne. Her powerful address as NCWNZ president at the Dunedin conference in 1935 called for women to come forward as candidates for New Zealand Parliament: "The world was made for both men and women, therefore both must take a proper share of conducting world affairs."

She continued her participation in the NCWNZ for many years thereafter. For example, at the 1945 NCWNZ conference in Napier, Kirk attended as a representative of the WCTU NZ: "This was the first conference at which eight nationally organised societies had official representation."

== Examples of speeches and essays ==
- "Woman's Place Not Confined to Home, Her Part In Nation's Councils - Miss C.E. Kirk's Challenging Address," (1935)
- "Protect Your Boys! Certainly – But How, and What About Your Girls?" (1942)
- "President's Message: Our Union - Its Strength, Beauty and Usefulness," (1947)
- "Presidential Address Delivered 17th February, 1949, by Miss C.E. Kirk, J.P. What Are Our Rights? How Far Have We made Use of them?" (1949)

== Honors ==
Kirk was given the King George V Silver Jubilee Medal in 1935 for her service to her community.

== Death ==
Cybele Ethel Kirk died on 19 May 1957 and is buried near her parents and her sister Lily May Kirk Atkinson in the Karori Cemetery in Wellington.

== See also ==
- National Council of Women of New Zealand
- Temperance movement in New Zealand
- Women's Christian Temperance Union of New Zealand
