= Ōtaki College =

New Zealand school in the Kāpiti Coast

- Māori: Te Kāreti o Ōtaki
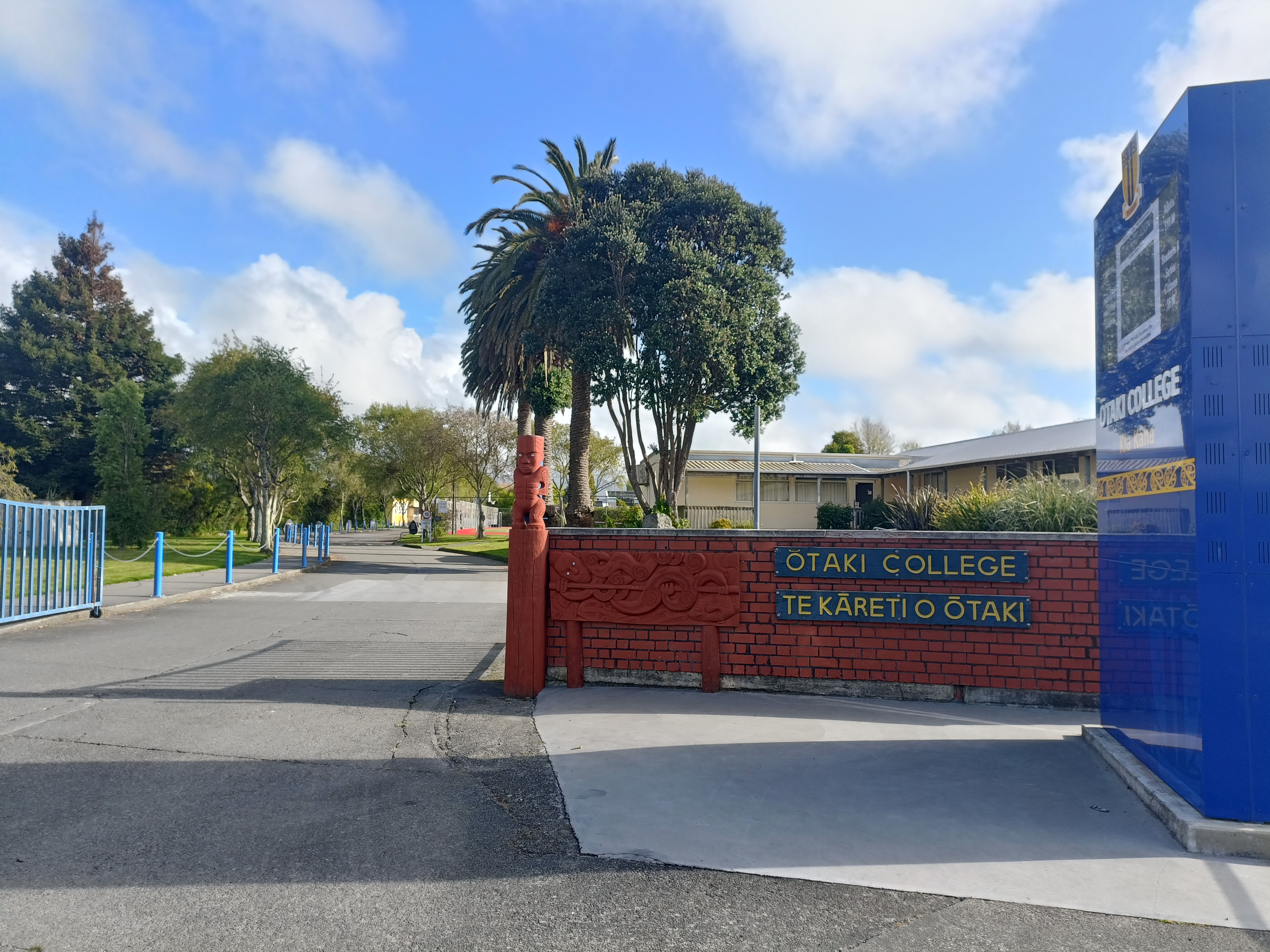

Location
- Mill Road, Ōtaki, New Zealand; 40.7602366°S 175.1527362°E

Information
- Type: Coeducational State Secondary (Year 7–13)
- Motto: Kia kaha, kia maia, kia manawanui.
- Established: 1959
- Ministry of Education Institution no.: 240
- Principal: Andy Fraser
- Enrolment: 422 (July 2026)
- Socio-economic decile: 4L
- Website: www.otakicollege.school.nz/

Ōtaki College is an intermediate and secondary school located in Ōtaki, in the north of the Kāpiti Coast in New Zealand. With a roll of 422 in July 2026, the college has been recognised for achieving success in spite of its Decile 4 ranking.

== History ==
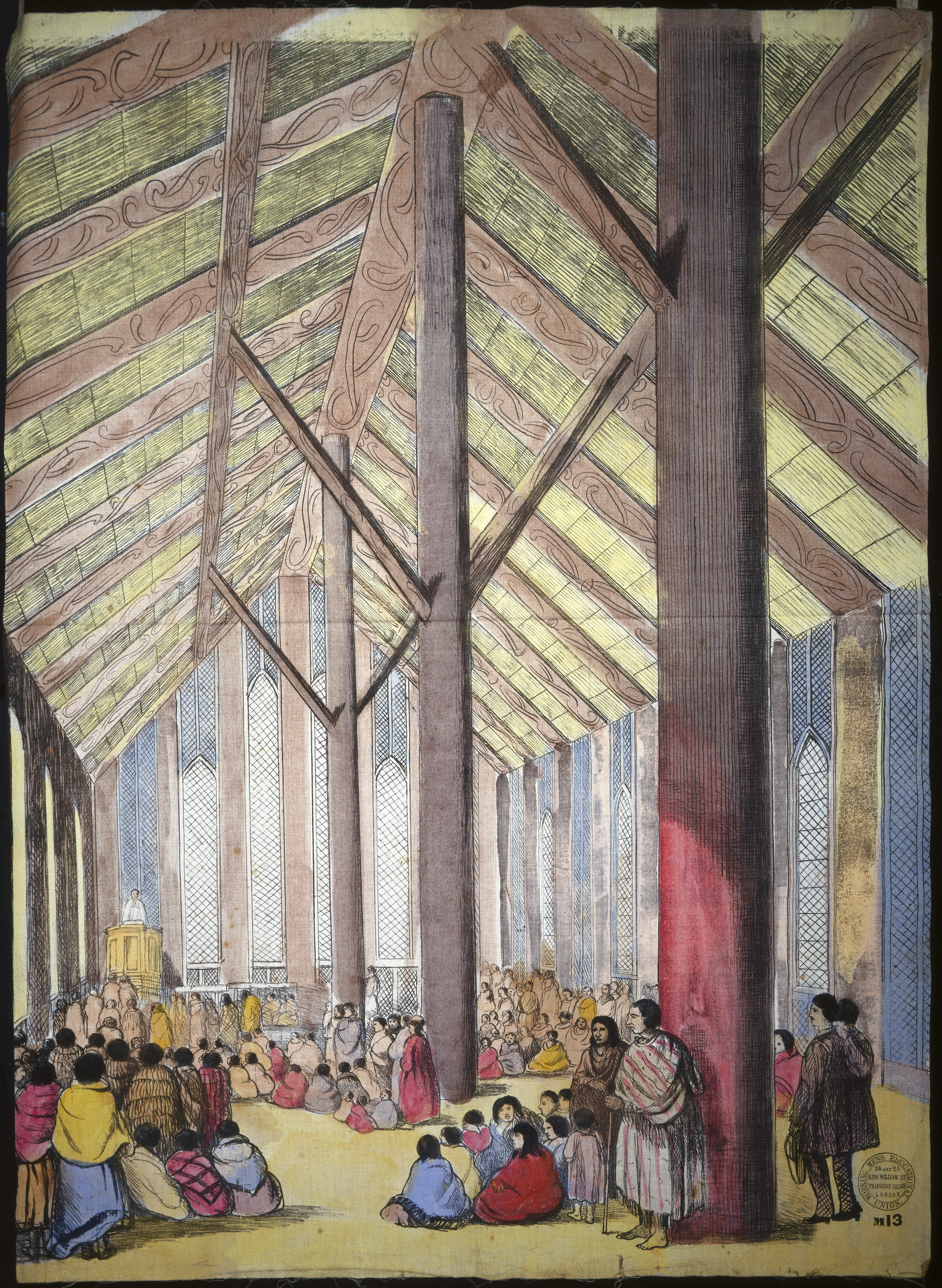
Interior of Rangiātea Church in Ōtaki by Barraud in circa 1851

In 1909 a school for Māori boys, Ōtaki Māori College, was established alongside a hostel dedicated for Māori use. The college building was built near the Rangiātea Church which had been built nearly 50 years earlier by Te Rauparaha. The new school, whose board of trustees controversially did not include Māori representatives, included an assembly hall, two large class rooms, to accommodate 100 pupils for technical education. In 1918 during the influenza epidemic, one of the teachers Cybele Kirk converted the assembly hall into a clinic holding 30 beds. This school for Māori boys was closed in 1939.

Before the present Ōtaki College was established, students from Ōtaki and the surrounding area had to travel north to Horowhenua College to receive education. As New Zealand's school-age population grew markedly after the Second World War, there was growing public pressure to establish a school in the region. The school was founded as Ōtaki District High School on 2 February 1959, and officially opened on 3 March 1960 by Minister of Education Philip Skoglund.

By 1961 the roll had grown to 217, and the school was formally incorporated as a college. At this time it also catered to manual training primary school students. Through the 1960s and 1970s, several facilities were constructed including a swimming pool, library, and gymnasium. The assembly hall block was officially opened in 1964 by Governor-general Bernard Fergusson.

== Demographics and relationship with Māori ==
As of 2026, Ōtaki College has an Equity Index of 495, placing it amongst schools whose students have many socioeconomic barriers to achievement (roughly equivalent to decile 4 under the former socio-economic decile system).

In 2014, the school is rated as Decile 4L, meaning a higher-than-average proportion of its students come from low-income households. In 2014, Ōtaki College was one of seven schools in New Zealand identified by the Education Review Office as the highest-performing low decile schools.

More than half of students at Ōtaki College are Māori, the majority of whom are from Ngāti Raukawa, the local iwi of Ōtaki. The school engages closely with Ngāti Raukawa, including through the board of trustees, learning plans, and in the college's tikanga and kawa. Each year, new students are welcomed to the college through a pōwhiri at Raukawa Marae.

== Notable alumni ==
Ōtaki College has produced several national representative sportspeople, including Olympic Kayaker John MacDonald, Commonwealth Games high-jumper Kelley O'Hagan, and Silver Fern Katarina Cooper.
