= Lily Atkinson =

New Zealand temperance campaigner, suffragist and feminist (1866–1921)

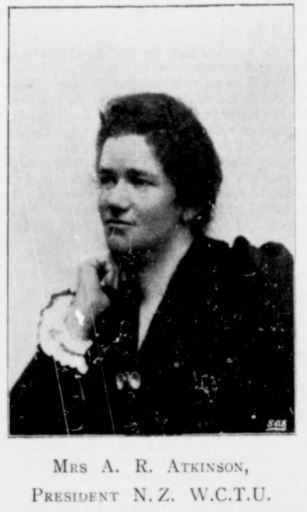
- Born: Lily May Kirk; 29 March 1866; Auckland, New Zealand
- Died: 19 July 1921 (aged 55); Wadestown, New Zealand
- Other name: Mrs. A.R. Atkinson
- Occupations: leader in political and social clubs, including temperance, education reform, advocacy for the rights of women and children
- Spouse: Arthur Atkinson (m. 1900)
- Children: Tom (1902), Janet Atkinson (1904–1981)
- Parent(s): Sarah Jane Mattocks and Thomas Kirk
- Relatives: brothers: Thomas William Kirk and Harry Borrer Kirk; sisters: Amy Kirk and Cybele Ethel Kirk

Lily May Atkinson (née Kirk, 29 March 1866 – 19 July 1921) was a New Zealand temperance campaigner, suffragist and feminist. She served in several leadership roles at the local and national levels including vice president of the New Zealand Alliance for Suppression and Abolition of the Liquor Traffic (1898–1921); president of Women's Christian Temperance Union New Zealand (1901–1905); and, vice president of the National Council of Women of New Zealand (1901–1903).

== Early life ==
Lily May Kirk was born in Auckland, New Zealand, on 29 March 1866. She was the daughter of Sarah Jane Mattocks and Thomas Kirk, a surveyor who went on to be an early professor at Victoria University College and the first Chief Conservator of State Forests in New Zealand. She received her education at Greenwood sisters' Terrace School, and in turn taught English to Chinese immigrants, and taught factory workers how to read. Despite never travelling overseas, she was fluent in German and French. She was an avid reader.

== Political work and family ==
Lily, along with her sisters Amy Kirk, Cybele Kirk and her mother Sarah Jane Kirk, was an early member of the Wellington branch of the Women's Christian Temperance Union of New Zealand (WCTU NZ) organised by Anne Ward on 3 September 1885. She served as the Auditor for the Wellington District Union then became the recording secretary for the National Union in 1887 and continued in this work for more than ten years.

She openly supported the work of Ellen Hewett (a.k.a. Mrs. Duff Hewitt) who, as WCTU NZ superintendent of Work Among Maoris, held a meeting 30 July 1894 in Wellington together with the Taupo chief Te Heu Heu and Hōne Heke Ngāpua M.H.R. At the meeting, Lily Kirk together with temperance activist Arthur Atkinson spoke in support of the WCTU NZ work in getting literature and pledge cards to people living in rural areas as well as a letter specifically directed to Maori women "at all the stopping places up the Whanganui River."

Starting in the spring of 1895, Lily May Kirk served on the founding committee for the WCTU NZ's journal The White Ribbon. This magazine was the first magazine owned, edited and published by women in New Zealand. She authored the Wellington Notes each month with information gleaned from her observations of Parliament, showing a sharp wit. For example, in November 1895, she wrote:

"The session of 1895 has at length closed, and I think the general feeling is one of relief. For four months we have been called upon to witness the utter incapacity of Ministers to conduct the public business of the country, and their disregard for its interests, their gross abuse of their privilege in slandering individuals, and their utter inability to control their own following. One would gladly draw the veil over it, and try to forget it, were it not for the enormous cost it has been, and that too in a time of depression, when the wisest and most prudent legislation was what the country needed."

During this time, the English classes that Lily May Kirk had been conducting with Chinese immigrants were halted. The Wellington WCTU reported to the national convention that they wished "to avoid clashing with the work of the Chinese Missionary, who is supported by the C.E. Union."

=== Forward Movement ===
She and future husband Arthur Atkinson were both involved along other Wellingtonians such as Kate Edger, Ernest Beaglehole and Maurice Richmond) in the Forward Movement, a progressive Christian/Educational movement and "a faithful attempt to bring the cardinal principles of Christianity, as conceived and interpreted by its best exponents, to bear on the complex conditions of modern society". The Forward Movement originated in London, England, and was founded in New Zealand in Wellington by the Reverend William Albert Evans (husband of Kate Edger) and the Reverend G.H. Bradbury. The Atkinsons joined a Committee of Management at the first meeting held on 27 August 1893.

=== New Zealand Alliance ===
In 1893 Lily May Kirk was appointed by the WCTU NZ to serve on the Executive Committee of the New Zealand Alliance for the Suppression and Prohibition of the Liquor Traffic, and in 1898 became the first woman to serve as a vice-president in this male-dominated group. In this position she served as a regular lecturer on temperance: "A clear, forceful, local speaker, her charming personality, her musical voice, her swift transition from grave to gay, and her wide and accurate knowledge made her a favourite with her many audiences." Her speech in May 1895 for the Alliance convention at Palmerston North included the charge that the English history of the start of the liquor trade came from aristocrats who wanted to keep the common folk compliant. And others did not miss the opportunity to pick up on her frequent allegories of battle in the fight against the liquor trade: one of her speeches was described as "decidedly to the point, chaste, calm, and dignified, and well aimed ... Probably of some it may be said, 'A woman slew him.'"

While president of the Wellington WCTU, Lily May Kirk worked with Kate Sheppard to organise public meetings in Canterbury in August 1895, lecturing on temperance first in Christchurch then Kaiapoi and Rangiora. Those who heard her lectures on the victims of the liquor traffic, the drunkard and those dependent upon him, spoke of her "logical, strong, yet sympathetic handling of this subject – how earnest yet how kind."

=== Southern Cross Society ===
Meanwhile, she and Anna Stout became vice presidents of the newly founded Southern Cross Society founded in Wellington on 22 August 1895. The founding president was Janet Plimmer, the current WCTU NZ Superintendent for Influencing the press, and the group proposed to educate women "of all classes and of all shades of opinion, to advocate for women who had to depend on their own exertions for a livelihood." The goal was to provide lectures and cottage meetings about political and civic topics so that as voters they would influence men holding office and to be ready to serve in Parliament when the law changed to allow them to stand for office. Temperance was a part of this instruction as well. Lady Stout explained: "The Society was not one for the suppression of mankind; it only desired that women should have equal rights with men, and not be debarred from living the fullest and freest life they might be qualified to live. Home would be happier when wives were competent to advise their husbands in every department, and were able to share their aspirations as well as their cares and sorrows." Lilly May Kirk continued her leadership in this club even as she was rising in the ranks of the national WCTU. In May 1898 she reported to the Southern Cross Society on how she voted on their behalf when she represented the club at the National Council of Women of New Zealand. There was no mention in The White Ribbon's notice of her report that she had been a part of a group who had argued against the NCWNZ's resolution for women to gain the right to stand for election to the New Zealand Parliament. Kirk, Stout and others emphasised that women must be educated in new ways, such as with the Southern Cross Society, that they had the ability to participate in the legislature with the training and fulsome classical education typically given to men.

== National WCTU leadership ==
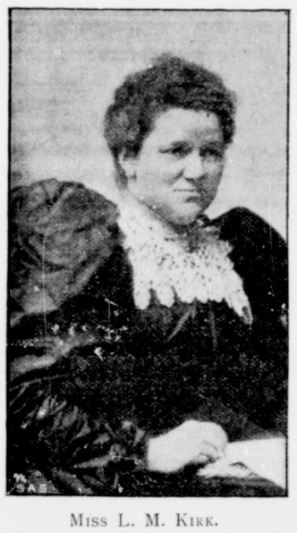

Identified as "Miss L.M. Kirk," she served as the recording secretary of the annual convention of the New Zealand Women's Christian Temperance Union held at Dunedin in April 1896. This important role served as a nod to her outreach work for the Wellington WCTU, her observational reports on the work by Parliament, as well as her oratory work for the New Zealand Alliance. It also required her to send letters on behalf of the national WCTU – including, for example, the ongoing work to repeal the Contagious Disease Acts or the bill for the "Removal of Political Disabilities of Women" – presenting the resolutions to politicians that increased her political visage at the national level. Alfred Newman, an Independent representing Wellington Suburbs in Parliament, responded to "Miss Kirk" in April 1896 in a letter that was published in The White Ribbon and illustrating the importance of the WCTU NZ's regular communications with politicians: "Such a letter is very encouraging. I propose to reintroduce the Bill. If your Union would ask of every candidate at the coming General Election to support such a measure, it would soon become the law of the land here, as it was in England many centuries ago, and as it is today already in Colorado and in South Australia."

Still serving as the WCTU NZ recording secretary, the national superintendent for the Legal and Parliamentary Department, and the managing committee for The White Ribbon, "Miss L.M. Kirk' was appointed in 1897 to represent the WCTU NZ at the National Council of Women of New Zealand (NCW NZ). Founded in 1896, the NCW NZ was a chapter of the International Council of Women and addressed many different reforms important to women activists of the day. Kirk gave a speech on "Moral and Scientific Aspect of Temperance" at the NCW NZ meeting in Christchurch on 1 April 1897. She continued her lecture tours in 1897 to help local chapters recruit members. She visited Brunnerton where she encouraged the start of a Boys' Club, and then three more clubs on the West Coast: Greymouth, Hokitika, and Nelson. The Greymouth WCTU reported to The White Ribbon why Kirk's oratory style was so successful: "Her voice is so soft and sweet, and her words so well chosen, that they sink into the hearts of her hearers and compel sympathy." She also helped organise the Petone branch in which the Girl's Sewing Guild became the most important work.

In 1898, the WCTU NZ sponsored a ceremony to honour the death of the American WCTU leader Frances Willard. Kirk gave an address on the work of the WCTU in Japan, and the correspondent reporting on her lecture stated: "It was very easily seen that she was feeling very deeply herself, and as a result others felt deeply too."

On 11 May 1900, Lily May Kirk married her fellow temperance activist and independent conservative MP Arthur Atkinson in Wellington. The WCTU NZ presented her with a wedding present of a writing table made of a variety of New Zealand woods with a number of drawers and pigeon holes. Affixed to the desk was a silver plate, on which they inscribed: "Presented to Miss L.M. Kirk, by the New Zealand W.C.T.U., on the occasion of her marriage. May, 1900."

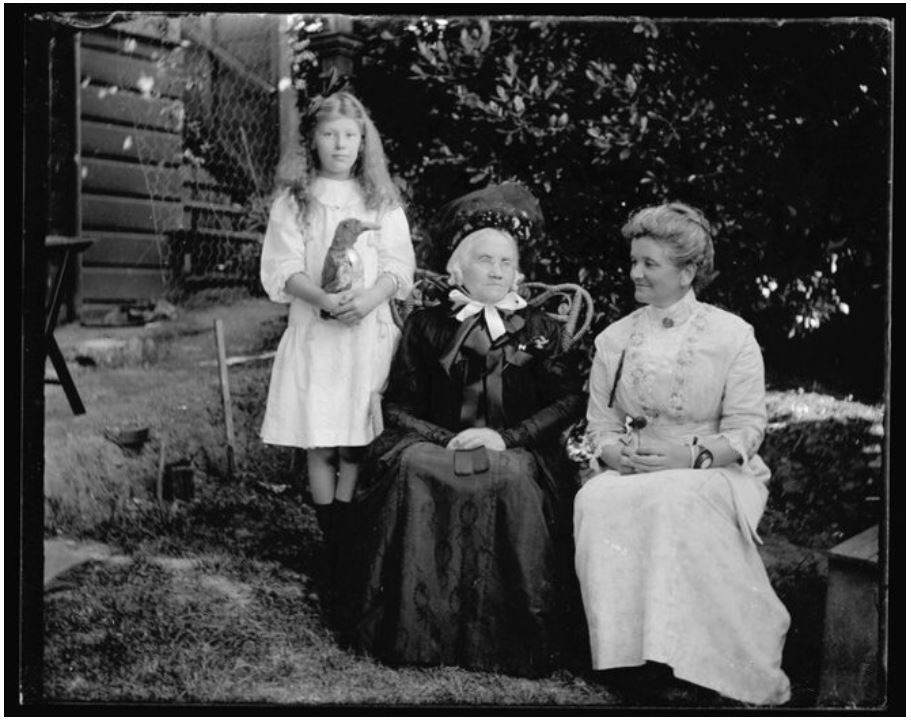
Janet Atkinson (left) with Sarah Jane Kirk (centre) and Lily May Atkinson (right) c. 1915

In March 1901, Lily May Kirk Atkinson attended the 16th Annual Convention of New Zealand Woman's Christian Temperance Union held in Wellington. She was the current recording secretary (a position she had held for fourteen years), the co-superintendent for Legal and Parliamentary Department. Atkinson was elected president of the WCTU of New Zealand, following after the national presidency of Annie Jane Schnackenberg of Auckland. Her mother, Sarah Jane Kirk, was at that time president of the Wellington WCTU, which hosted the 1901 national convention. Atkinson served as president for the next four years. During that time she had two children: Tom in April 1902 (who died only three days after he was born), and Janet, who was born 19 September 1904 (died 1981).

During her years of leadership, the WCTU NZ took the lead in many different kinds of social reform and humanitarian legislation. The rise in the number of No-License districts, created out of the Alcoholic Liquors Sale Control Act of 1893 was of no surprise given the close work between WCTU NZ and the New Zealand Alliance. Failing health in 1906 compelled her to step down as WCTU NZ president; however, she continued with local reform work.

== National Council of Women of New Zealand ==
Atkinson was elected vice president of the National Council of Women of New Zealand (NCW NZ) at their sixth conference in May 1901 at Wanganui. She served under Margaret Sievwright as president until 1903 then under Kate Sheppard again in 1905. By this point Kirk had revised her ideas about women in political office since she attended in August 1903 the NCWNZ delegation with Sievwright and Kate Sheppard that petitioned the Premier Richard Seddon to get his support (in vain) for removing the ban on women in Parliament. After 1906 the NCWNZ did not meet again, until its revival in 1918.

== Leadership in clubs committed to health and protection of women and children ==
=== Society for the Protection of Women and Children ===
The New Zealand Society for the Protection of Women and Children was founded in Auckland in April 1893. By 1897 Atkinson and Lady Anna Stout called for volunteers to join a new Wellington branch, and the branch began reporting on its work in the local newspapers. In addition to working on behalf of women and children, the Wellington branch also advocated for equal pay for women workers.

The club would send volunteers to the courts to watch for how the judges would handle the fates of arrested juveniles or prosecution of delinquent husbands. At an annual meeting in 1909 over which Atkinson presided, they reported that volunteers were able to find homes for neglected children and funds for an impoverished family with no wage-earners.

With the onset of World War I, the club was not successful in pressing issues that were of crucial importance for the protection of women and children: "such as the appointment of policewomen, women jurors, women justices, and women visiting justices to prison." Another important issue for this group was to raise the legal age of consent. They petitioned the prime minister in 1913 for the age of consent for boys to be raised to eighteen so "to be protected from the solicitations of older women... and preventive for the spread of diseases" and, as Atkinson emphasised during this deputation visit, the age of twenty-one for girls since that was when they could control their own wages and property.

=== Training for women in domestic sciences ===
As part of a campaign to institutionalise support for women and children, Atkinson was part of a movement to reform secondary and tertiary curriculum for home economics. In 1913, Atkinson presided at two conferences organised by Victoria College on how to create a new department "Domestic Economy" and to fund a department chair to oversee this new curriculum and outreach. The goal was to professionalise and modernise the instruction, offer access to funded housing through the newly created Thomas George Macarthy Fund, and to expand embedded practical training already in place at training colleges.

=== Wellington Pioneer Club ===
The Pioneer Club, founded in Wellington in July 1909, was based on a similar feminist organisation in London. At the organising meeting, Lily May Atkinson read out the rules established earlier by the Provisional Committee, stating that the club's purpose was for women's education, conversation and "silence." The club was to be non-political in nature, and, there was to be no alcohol or gambling. Mary Richmond, Atkinson's cousin, was elected president; Atkinson was elected vice-president; and, Amy Kane was elected secretary. Opening on 30 July 1909, on the corner of Cuba and Manners Streets (it was later moved to Lambton Quay) with meeting space and a tea room, this was the first general women's club in New Zealand.

== Liquor Licensing Committee ==
In 1912 Atkinson made the news when she was nominated for and won a seat on the committee for the Wellington Suburbs and Country Licensing District. She won the seat, coming in third for the Suburbs district with 519 votes.

Atkinson's leadership was also shown in her work for the New Zealand Community Welfare Association. She was also active in the Plunket Society and the Kindergarten Schools Society. Probably sometime after 1920 when there was a call for women leaders to support the movement to enforce compulsory military training in New Zealand, Atkinson became a member of the Dominion Council of the National Defence League of New Zealand. By then, the role of the league emphasised the fear of Japanese aggression in the Pacific and the need for men and women to be educated in civic morality and survival preparedness in specially designated camp institutes. "The influence of good women on soldiers away from home was incalculable." This call fit in very well with Atkinson's experience with educational reform for women's domestic sciences.

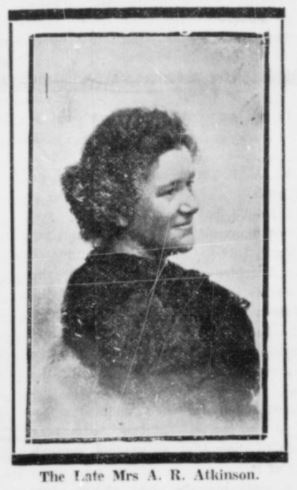
Portrait from tribute in The White Ribbon, 18 August 1921

== Examples of oratory and papers given ==
- Substance of Miss Kirk's Address, The White Ribbon, 1 September 1895
- Miss Kirk at Gisborne, The White Ribbon, 1 October 1896
- The Moral and Social Aspects of Temperance. A Paper written by Miss L.M. Kirk, of Wellington, and read at the meeting of the Women's National Council in Christchurch, The White Ribbon, 1 June 1897
- Address by Miss L.M. Kirk on the Liquor Traffic, Its Abolition by the Will of the People, The White Ribbon, 1 February 1899

== Illness and death ==
Atkinson took up the mantle again with WCTU NZ acting as the recording secretary at the national convention in 1921. And, she agreed to go with a deputation to meet with the minister of health about a proposed Social Hygiene Bill. However, she grew too ill to go. She had campaigned in the New Zealand winter weather of July 1921 for some Taranaki Unions which had required "a good deal of motoring in very cold and wet weather." After about a week of feeling ill, she took to her bed and was given pain medicine by her doctor.

She continued with her correspondence and reading but her husband wrote that she was overcome while correcting some Sunday School exam papers. She tried to dictate a letter to Mrs. Scott of Hawera WCTU but her daughter Janet Atkinson wrote that the letter was never finished. Her husband told the readers of The White Ribbon the details: "Delirium developed during the night, and at a consultation next morning the diagnosis was that uraemia had supervened on pyelitis, and that the condition was critical. 'I've faced worse stunts than this,' she said quite cheerfully ... On the evening of Tuesday, 19th July, almost exactly 48 hours after she had had to abandon her last attempt to serve the temperance cause ... she passed peacefully away [in her sleep]."

Atkinson died in her home in Wadestown, a northern suburb of Wellington, on 19 July 1921. Her funeral was held at the Baptist Church, Vivian Street and she was buried in an unmarked plot (Plot 3K) in the Karori Cemetery alongside her parents, her son Tom and her husband (who died in 1935).

== See also ==
- Temperance movement in New Zealand
- Women's Christian Temperance Union New Zealand
- Women's suffrage in New Zealand
