= Thomas William Kirk =

New Zealand biologist and scientific administrator

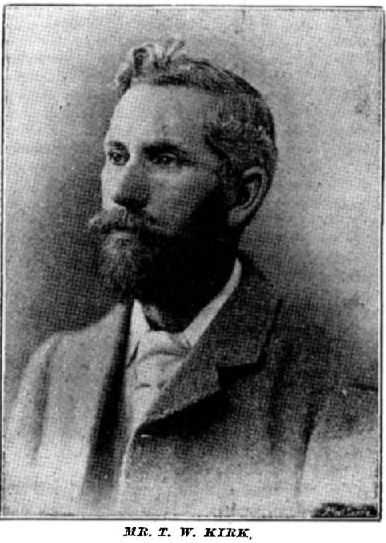
- Born: 30 June 1856; Coventry, Warwickshire, England
- Died: 19 May 1936 (aged 79); Raumati Beach, New Zealand
- Occupations: Government Biologist, NZ Department of Agriculture
- Spouse: Edith Dixon Callcott Kirk (m. 13 December 1883)
- Children: 1
- Parent(s): Sarah Jane Mattocks and Thomas Kirk
- Relatives: Harry Borrer Kirk (brother), and sisters Amy Kirk, Lily May Atkinson, Cybele Ethel Kirk

Thomas William Kirk (30 June 1856 – 19 May 1936) was a biologist and a scientific administrator from New Zealand. He studied the fauna and flora of New Zealand.

== Early life ==
Thomas William Kirk was born in Coventry, England, on 30 June 1856. He was the eldest surviving son of Sarah Jane Mattocks and Thomas Kirk, and he emigrated to Auckland with his parents and three other siblings in 1863: an older brother (name unknown); Harry Borrer Kirk, and Amy Kirk. Five other siblings were born in New Zealand: Lily May Atkinson and Cybele Ethel Kirk were the only two surviving past childhood. He was educated at St. James' School and Auckland College, then started working on the Geological Survey staff of Sir James Hector in 1874. On 13 December 1883 he married Edith Dixon Callcott (24 October 1859 – 26 July 1938). They had a son, Bernard Callcott Kirk, born 23 April 1888, who served in World War I in the New Zealand Rifle Brigade as a Major and then on 7 November 1940 he signed up again, this time a captain.

== Work ==
T.W. Kirk worked in the New Zealand Geological Survey Department for seventeen years and produced numerous scientific papers published in periodicals such as Transactions of the New Zealand Institute, Annuals and Magazines of Natural History, Nature, Science Gossip, the French Journal of Conchology, and the Royal Society of S.A.. More than ten papers focused on different aspects of marine zoology. During this time he was elected to the New Zealand Institute (1878), the Geological Society of Australia (1887), the Microscopic Society of London (1889) and became a fellow of the Linnaean Society (1890).

His first public appointment was in 1874 as assistant curator of the Colonial Museum in Wellington. In 1892 Kirk was hired in the New Zealand Education Department then transferred to the new Department of Agriculture and began publishing leaflets (many of which he wrote himself) to help educate fruit-growers. Within three years was chief of the division of biology and pomology. Kirk focused on supporting orchardists and managing government programs to put inspectors out in the field. By 1896 he was successful in getting the House of Representatives to pass the Orchards and Garden Pests Act which halted imported plant diseases at the borders. He also supported the development of farming with outreach to growers to learn about market gardening and beekeeping.

Kirk conducted the first experiment in biological control of insect pests when he introduced the Australian ladybird beetle (vedalia) to control the cottony cushion scale that attacked fruit trees as well as foliage crucial for New Zealand birds. His leadership in the Department of Agriculture provided support for farm exports, loans and cooperative farmer organisations, including the creation in 1916 of the New Zealand Fruitgrowers' Federation.

He named various taxa of New Zealand molluscs, including:

- Cylichna zelandica T.W. Kirk, 1880, a sea snail

== Retirement and death ==
In June 1921 Kirk retired and spent his time working with the groups involved with Freemasonry: he was a past master of Coronation Lodge, a foundation member and first master of Lodge Tawera-o-Kapiti and past senior grand deacon of the Grand Lodge of New Zealand.

In 1933 he and Edith celebrated their fiftieth wedding anniversary. By this point they were living in Raumati Beach, a seaside resort northwest of Wellington. He wrote his will in 1934 in which he gave everything to his wife, Edith, and he provided a yearly stipend to his wife's sister, Lizzie Woodward Callcott. He also directed that some of his estate go to his unmarried sisters Amy Kirk and Cybele Ethel Kirk - to be shared equally with his son Bernard Callcott Kirk, wife Vyvian Dorothy Kirk and grandson Ian Vosper Kirk. He died on 19 May 1936 at his home at Raumati Beach near Paraparaumu. He is buried in Paraparaumu Beach Cemetery in Paraparaumu.

== Resources ==
- Nightingale, Tony. "Kirk, Thomas William". Te Ara - the Encyclopedia of New Zealand.
