= Ranunculus membranifolius =

Scientific classification
- Kingdom: Plantae
- Clade: Tracheophytes
- Clade: Angiosperms
- Clade: Eudicots
- Order: Ranunculales
- Family: Ranunculaceae
- Genus: Ranunculus
- Species: R. membranifolius

Binomial name
- Ranunculus membranifolius (Kirk) Garn.-Jones

Synonyms
- Ranunculus hirtus var. membranifolius Kirk; Ranunculus hirtus var. stoloniferus Kirk

Species of flowering plant

Ranunculus membranifolius is a species of flowering plant in the buttercup family Ranunculaceae. It is endemic to New Zealand.
