= Cylichna zealandica =

Scientific classification
- Domain: Eukaryota
- Kingdom: Animalia
- Phylum: Mollusca
- Class: Gastropoda
- Order: Cephalaspidea
- Family: Cylichnidae
- Genus: Cylichna
- Species: C. zealandica

Binomial name
- Cylichna zealandica T.W. Kirk, 1880

Species of gastropod

Cylichna zealandica is a species of sea snail or bubble snail, a marine opisthobranch gastropod mollusk in the family Cylichnidae, the chalice bubble snails or canoe bubble snails.

== Description ==
The height of the shell is 9 mm, its diameter 3.8 mm. The white, strong shell is smooth and faintly longitudinally striated. The aperture is produced above the spire.

== Distribution ==
This marine species is endemic to New Zealand and occurs off North Island at a depth of 60 m.
