= Mary Player =

New Zealand servant, midwife, and social reformer

Mary Josephine Player (née Crampton; c. 1857 – 5 January 1924) was a New Zealand servant, midwife, welfare worker, feminist and social reformer.

== Biography ==
She was born in County Kilkenny, Ireland in about 1857 as Mary Josephine Crampton. She founded the Women's Social and Political League in Wellington and was its president for many years. Based on her proposals and through lobbying of William Pember Reeves, the Minister of Labour, the Department of Labour established a women's branch. Through political infighting within the organisation, Player resigned the presidency and was replaced by Louisa Seddon, whose objective it was to endorse the increasingly conservative policies of the Liberal Government, which was led by her husband Richard Seddon.

Player was from a poor background and struggled to support herself after her husband's death in 1905. She would take on much nursing work where she could live on site, as she and her children would otherwise have been left homeless. After her daughters had married, she lived with some of them. She died by drowning in the Nelson suburb of Atawhai on 5 January 1924 at one of her daughter's homes; the coroner ruled that the death was a suicide due to depression. She was buried at Karori Cemetery next to her husband.
