= Robert Coupland Harding =

New Zealand printer, typographer and journalist

Robert Coupland Harding (19 October 1849 – 16 December 1916) was a New Zealand printer, typographer and journalist. He was born in Wellington, New Zealand on 19 October 1849.
