= Thomas Kirk (botanist) =

English-born botanist, teacher, public servant, writer and churchman

Thomas Kirk FLS
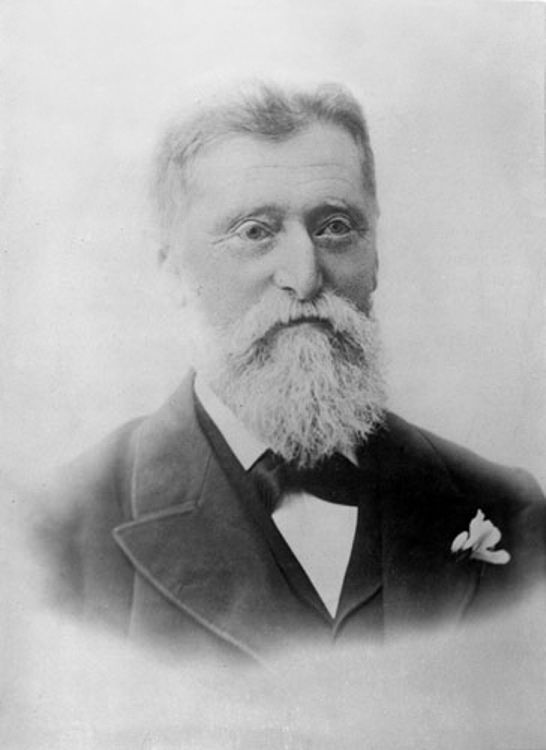
- Born: 18 January 1828; Coventry, Warwickshire, England
- Died: 8 March 1898 (aged 70); Plimmerton, New Zealand
- Resting place: Karori Cemetery, Wellington
- Occupations: Botanist writer teacher Public servant Churchman; Surveyor
- Organization: Auckland Institute
- Known for: Botanical expeditions 130 papers on Botany
- Spouse: Sarah Jane Kirk née Mattocks (married 25 December 1850)
- Children: 9, including Thomas William Kirk (1856–1936), Harry Borrer Kirk (1859–1948), Amy Kirk (1861–1945), Lily May Atkinson (1866–1921), Cybele Ethel Kirk (1870–1957)
- Parent(s): George Kirk; Sarah West

Thomas Kirk FLS (18 January 1828 – 8 March 1898) was an English-born botanist, teacher, public servant, writer and churchman who moved to New Zealand with his wife and four children in late 1862. The New Zealand government commissioned him in 1884 to compile a report on the indigenous forests of the country and appointed him as chief conservator of forests the following year. He published 130 papers in botany and plants including The Durability of New Zealand Timbers, The Forest Flora of New Zealand and Students' Flora of New Zealand.

== Early life and career ==
Thomas was the son of a Coventry nurseryman, George Kirk, and Sarah West, a florist. As a consequence of his parents' involvement in nursery work, he displayed a keen interest in botany, and later worked at a timber mill in Coventry. On Christmas Day 1850 he married a silk marker, Sarah Jane Mattocks. Poor health and financial problems led to his emigrating to Auckland, arriving with his family on 9 February 1863. Thomas and Sarah Jane added another five children to their large family between 1864 and 1870; however, two (twins) died as infants and another daughter died at the age of five.

Soon after his arrival Kirk started on a collection of botanical specimens. He prepared a set of ferns and other plants for the New Zealand Exhibition which was held in Dunedin in January 1865. In the following year he worked as surveyor, and in 1868 became a meteorological observer in Auckland. In the same year he was appointed secretary of the Auckland Institute and took on the position of museum curator, an office he filled for the next five years.

Kirk took part in a number of botanical expeditions, writing and publishing reports on the results. These included Great Barrier and Little Barrier Islands in 1867, the east coast of Northland in 1868, the Thames goldfields in 1869, the Waikato district in 1870, and Rotorua and Taupō in 1872. Between 1869 and 1873 he found time to serve as secretary and treasurer of the Auckland Acclimatisation Society, teaching botany at the Auckland College and Grammar School and became an elected fellow of the Linnean Society of London in 1871.

In early 1874 he moved to Wellington and until 1880 lectured there in natural sciences at Wellington College, which was then affiliated to the University of New Zealand. Kirk proved to be a skilled teacher, enjoying the respect of staff and students. In 1874 he became a member of the Wellington Philosophical Society, serving as president in 1878 and 1879. Sir Julius Vogel credited Kirk's work in helping to get the first Forestry Act passed in 1874. He was an elected Governor of the New Zealand Institute in 1875.

He was appointed lecturer in natural science at Lincoln School of Agriculture, in Canterbury in 1881, and stayed until 1882, returning in 1883 and 1884. During this period he botanised in Arthur's Pass, Banks Peninsula, Lake Wakatipu and Stewart Island.

== Botanical expeditions ==
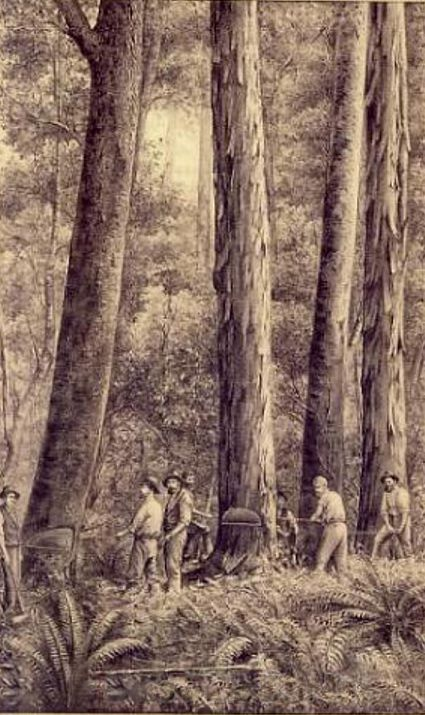
"Felling Matai (Prumnopitys taxifolia) and Red Wood (Sequoia sempervirens) in Seaward Forest"

The New Zealand government commissioned him in 1884 to compile a report on the indigenous forests of the country and appointed him as chief conservator of forests the following year. Although not trained as a forester, he was in favour of sound forest conservation. He founded the forest and agriculture branch of the Crown Lands Department, implemented regulations to curb the misuse of forests, and was instrumental in setting aside some 800 000 acres as forest reserves by 1888. Kirk was recalled in 1889 from retrenchment to work on the Forest flora of New Zealand, but died in the midst of this great work. At the time it was hoped that the work could be published under the supervision of his son, H. B. Kirk.

Retrenchment did not dampen Kirk's botanical enthusiasm. He explored The Snares, Auckland Island, Campbell Island and Antipodes Islands and Stewart Island in 1890, and in later years the headwaters of the Turakina and Rangitīkei Rivers.

== Death ==
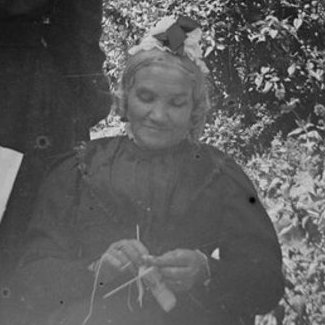
Sarah Jane Kirk in 1895

Kirk died in straitened circumstances of a pleural abscess on 8 March 1898. He was buried in an unmarked grave in Plot 3K of Karori Cemetery in Wellington. He was survived by his wife, Sarah, and five of his nine children. His two sons Harry Borrer Kirk and Thomas William Kirk both continued their work in education, public service and agriculture. His eldest daughter, Amy Kirk was a teacher, church worker and charitable aid hospital visitor in Wellington. Another daughter Lily May Atkinson, was a well-known suffragette and temperance campaigner who became president of the Woman's Christian Temperance Union of New Zealand (1902–1905) and helped found the New Zealand Society for Protection of Women and Children in Wellington. His youngest daughter Cybele Ethel Kirk, a suffragist, temperance evangelist, worked with unmarried and abandoned women and became a Justice of the Peace. Despite appeals, his widow was denied any compassionate grant from the Government.

Sir Joseph Dalton Hooker wrote of Kirk's death: "This is a great loss to Botany, for indeed except the late Baron von Mueller there was no other cultivator of Botany in the Southern Hemisphere who could compare with him and I have been looking for years for the Forest Flora of New Zealand by him as to a work of very great scientific importance".

== Works and legacy ==
Kirk wrote some 130 papers on botany and plants, published in New Zealand and British journals. In 1875 his report on The Durability of New Zealand Timbers appeared, then The Forest Flora of New Zealand in 1889, followed by Students' Flora of New Zealand, published after his death in 1898. The Forest Flora of New Zealand was described by printer and journalist Robert Coupland Harding as:

From the Government Printer we have received a copy of one of the most interesting as well as the most valuable works yet issued by the Government of this colony—the Forest Flora of New Zealand. The book is foolscap folio, and like all Mr Didsbury's productions, is well and correctly printed. All our varied forest trees and shrubs are minutely described and illustrated; the native and vulgar names are given, the properties and uses are set forth in popular language as well as in the ordinary scientific style. The plates number one hundred and forty-two, and are chiefly executed by the draftsmen of the Survey Department. Most of them are signed by Mr Hugh Boscawen, and reflect great credit on his skill as a botanical artist. We notice other names of the survey staff, as well as those of Mr A. Hamilton of Napier, and Mr D. Blair. The work is written and compiled by Mr T. Kirk, f.l.s., and is highly creditable to the author. The contents might have been more systematically arranged, as we find closely allied species widely separated, altogether alien forms coming in between. The illustrations as a rule are excellent, but being by different hands exhibit a want of uniformity. Some are fully shaded; others in almost pure outline. In an appendix the plants are systematically classified, and to have followed this arrangement in the body of the work would have been an improvement. A comparative table at the end showing at one view the particulars scattered through the work as to strength, specific gravity, &c, of the various woods, would have been an acceptable addition. We would be sorry to criticise so excellent and valuable a work in any spirit of faultfinding. A limited number, we believe, were printed on large paper. It would have been well to have issued a number for sale, as the narrow margin to some of the plates will not be pleasing to book-lovers.

— Robert Coupland Harding, Typo: A Monthly Newspaper and Literary Review, Volume 3

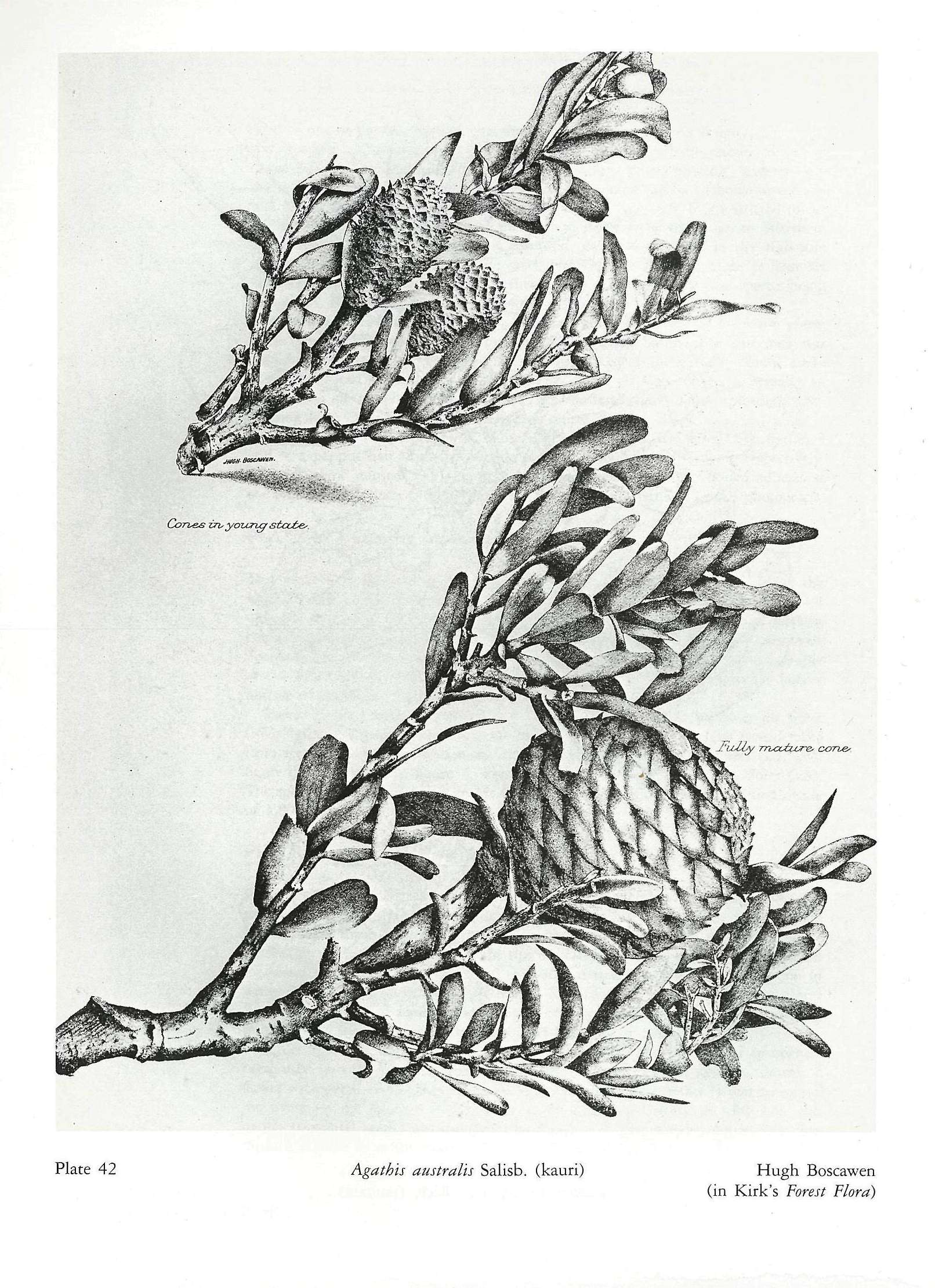
Agathis australis by John Hugh Boscawen (1851–1937)

Thomas Kirk did not produce any of the illustrations for The Forest Flora of New Zealand, though they were carried out under his supervision. Drawings were done by draughtsmen of the Survey Department, while a Mr D. Blair and Mr A. Hamilton contributed at least twenty-six of the plates. Two staff members of the Survey Department, Hugh McKean and Hugh Boscawen, each contributed thirty-eight signed plates. Other artists were E. J. Graham (twenty-nine plates) and W. de R. Barclay (one plate). A close scrutiny of the twenty unsigned plates suggests they were the work of Boscawen or Hamilton.

In 1878 Kirk calculated that after five years, a pair of house sparrow would lead to a population of 322,000.

== Bibliography ==
- Brown, L. The forestry era of Professor Thomas Kirk. Wellington, 1968
- Glenn, R. [M. M. Johnson]. The botanical explorers of New Zealand. Wellington, 1950
- Moore, L. B. Thomas Kirk, botanist. Tuatara 20, No 2 (1973): 51—56
