= Karori Cemetery =

Cemetery in Wellington, New Zealand

Coordinates: 41.275°S 174.750°E

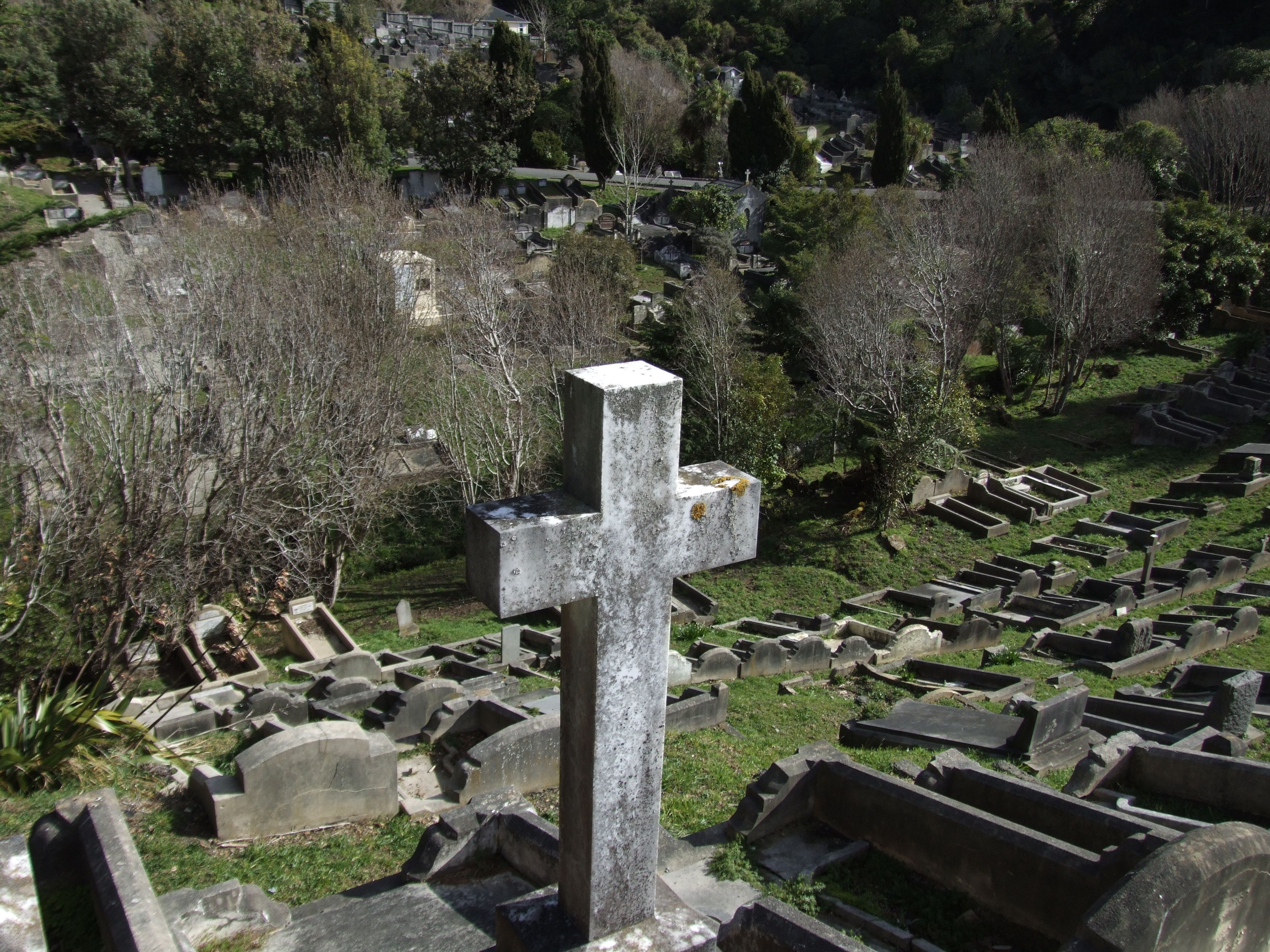
- View of Karori Cemetery
- Interactive map of Karori Cemetery

Details
- Established: 1891
- Location: Karori
- Country: New Zealand
- Owned by: Wellington City Council
- No. of graves: 95,000
- Website: Wellington City Council entry for Karori Cemetery
- Footnotes: cemeteries database

Karori Cemetery, located in the Wellington suburb of Karori, is the second-largest cemetery in New Zealand (after Waikumete Cemetery in Auckland). It opened in 1891 to replace Bolton Street Cemetery, and reached capacity and was closed to most burials in the 1960s when Mākara Cemetery opened. Karori Cemetery contains several heritage-listed structures and is the burial place of many notable people. It is popular as a quiet recreation area for walking, jogging and cycling, and for heritage-related exploration and tours.

== History ==
Bolton Street Cemetery had been in use as a public cemetery from 1840, but by the 1880s it was almost at capacity and Wellington City Council began searching for a site for a new cemetery. Under the Cemeteries Act 1882 a cemetery could not be established within the boundary of an existing city. The Council considered properties in Kilbirnie, Island Bay and Khandallah, which were not yet part of Wellington city, before settling on Karori. In June 1890, the Evening Post reported that at the rate of 25 burials per month, Bolton Street would run out of space in the next two months. As a result, about 58 people were interred in the previously unused cemetery reserve at Glenbervie Road (now part of Bowen Street) during 1890 and 1891.

In 1890, Wellington City Council bought 95 acres of land at Karori and, after forming an access road and appointing a sexton, declared Karori Cemetery open on 1 August 1891. The first burial was that of a premature baby named Frederick William Fish, who died on 1 August and was interred on 3 August 1891. In 1892 Bolton Street Cemetery was closed to burials except for relatives of those already interred there.

In 1907, the 58 bodies interred at the cemetery reserve during 1890–1891 were dug up and re-interred at Karori Cemetery and the Sydney Street section of Bolton Cemetery. A recreation ground, now known as Anderson Park, was built on the former cemetery reserve.

A sexton's cottage and mourners' shelter were built in 1891. The mourners' shelter still exists and has a Historic Place Category 2 classification from Heritage New Zealand. In 1909, New Zealand's first crematorium was built at Karori Cemetery.

Many Wellington victims of the influenza pandemic of 1918–1919 were buried at Karori Cemetery. At the peak of the outbreak, on 18 November 1918, 63 people in Wellington died of influenza. The city sexton reported that there were 709 interments at the cemetery in November 1918, compared to 88 in November 1917. Police and other authorities were under pressure, and at one stage Post Office trucks were used to take 16 bodies at a time to the cemetery.

A Services section was created at the cemetery in 1918–1919 and was intended to emulate the British war cemeteries being established in Europe at that time. During World War 1, 507 soldiers died at military training camps, mainly at Trentham and Featherston. Many of these men were buried at Karori Cemetery during the war, and some were reinterred in the Services section after its formation. This number includes 118 soldiers buried in the newly set-aside Services section during a three-week period in November 1918 at the height of the influenza epidemic. A lychgate and memorial arch were later erected in the Services section.

Although Karori Cemetery was nearing capacity during the 1950s, a new chapel was built and opened in 1959. By the 1960s there were more cremations than burials, with about 60% of Wellingtonians opting for cremation. Mākara Cemetery became Wellington's main burial ground from 1965. Burials at Karori now take place only in pre-purchased family plots, in children's plots, and in pre-purchased ash plots.

In the 1970s, residents' associations in Wilton and Northland complained about the view of the cemetery, so in 1975 Wellington City Council planted 4,670 trees and shrubs to screen the cemetery from nearby suburbs. As the trees reached maturity decades later, they posed new management issues.

== Description ==
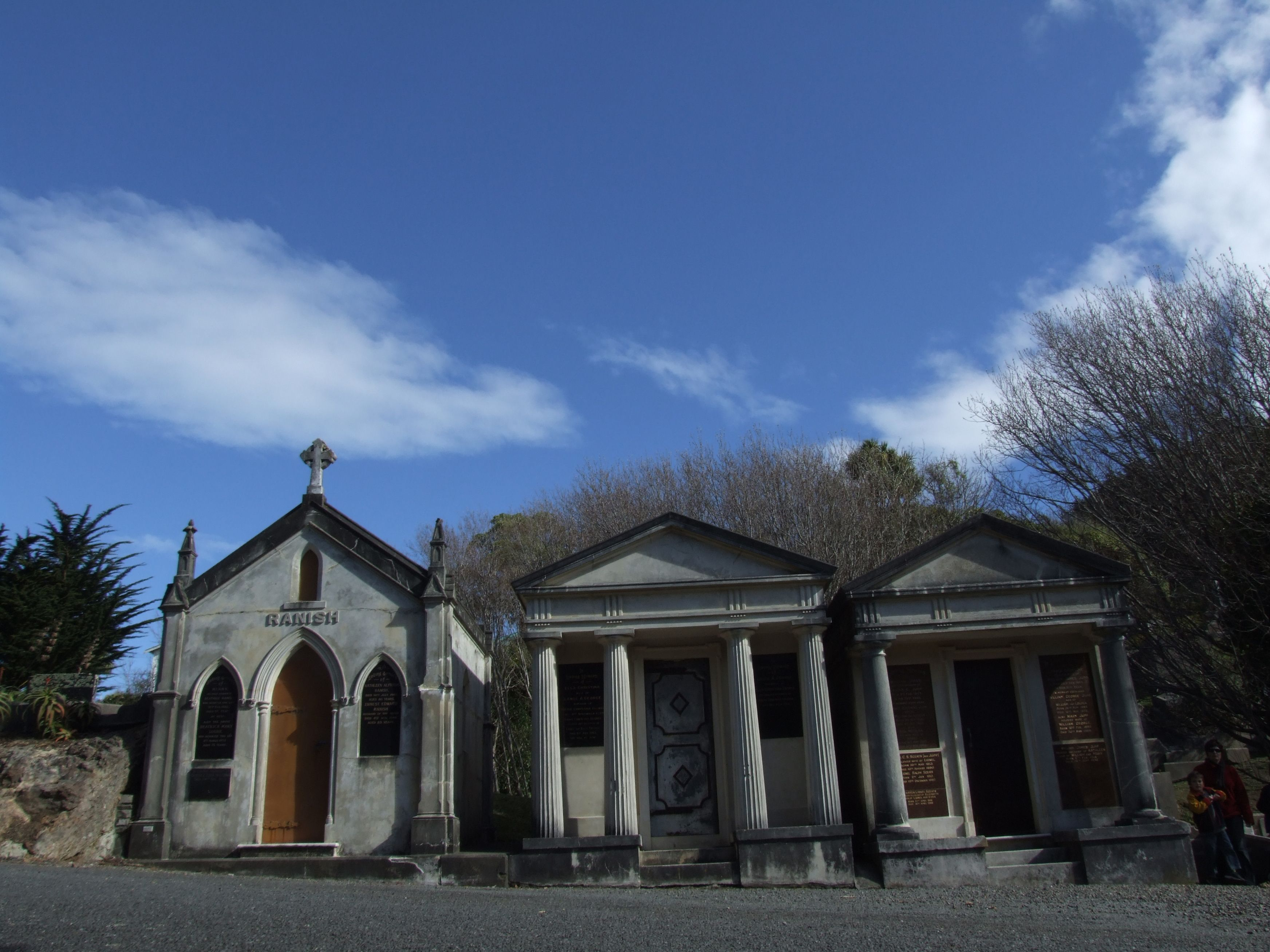
Three vaults in the cemetery

The cemetery covers almost 40 hectares (99 acres) and has seen more than 83,000 burials. It has areas dedicated to different religions – Church of England, Roman Catholic, Jewish, Greek Orthodox, Salvation Army, Chinese – as well as public (non-denominational) areas, a soldiers' section, an infants' section and a lawn cemetery. There is also a memorial rose garden. As well as concreted graves, some adorned with fences, obelisks or statuary, there are 24 family vaults in the cemetery and there is a lawn area where plaques are set into the grass. There are also five columbaria (walls with niches containing ashes in urns). The topography and drainage patterns have influenced the layout of the cemetery. In flatter areas a grid layout of graves in rows is apparent and the cemetery has a formal character, while on steep slopes the graves are placed less formally.

Two streams flow through the cemetery to meet the Kaiwharawhara Stream which marks the cemetery's eastern boundary. A stream gully containing mature pine and macrocarpa trees divides the cemetery into eastern and western areas. The forested slopes in the north of the cemetery border Otari-Wilton Bush and are managed as part of the Outer Green Belt, a series of reserves that separate Wellington's urban and rural areas. Parts of the cemetery are very overgrown. In some places, planted or self-seeded flax and trees have grown too close to graves and walls and damaged them. Large scale removal of trees may expose graves to weather and erosion, so management focuses on thinning trees and removing debris. The Friends of Karori Cemetery conduct working bees to help maintain graves and plant appropriate plants.

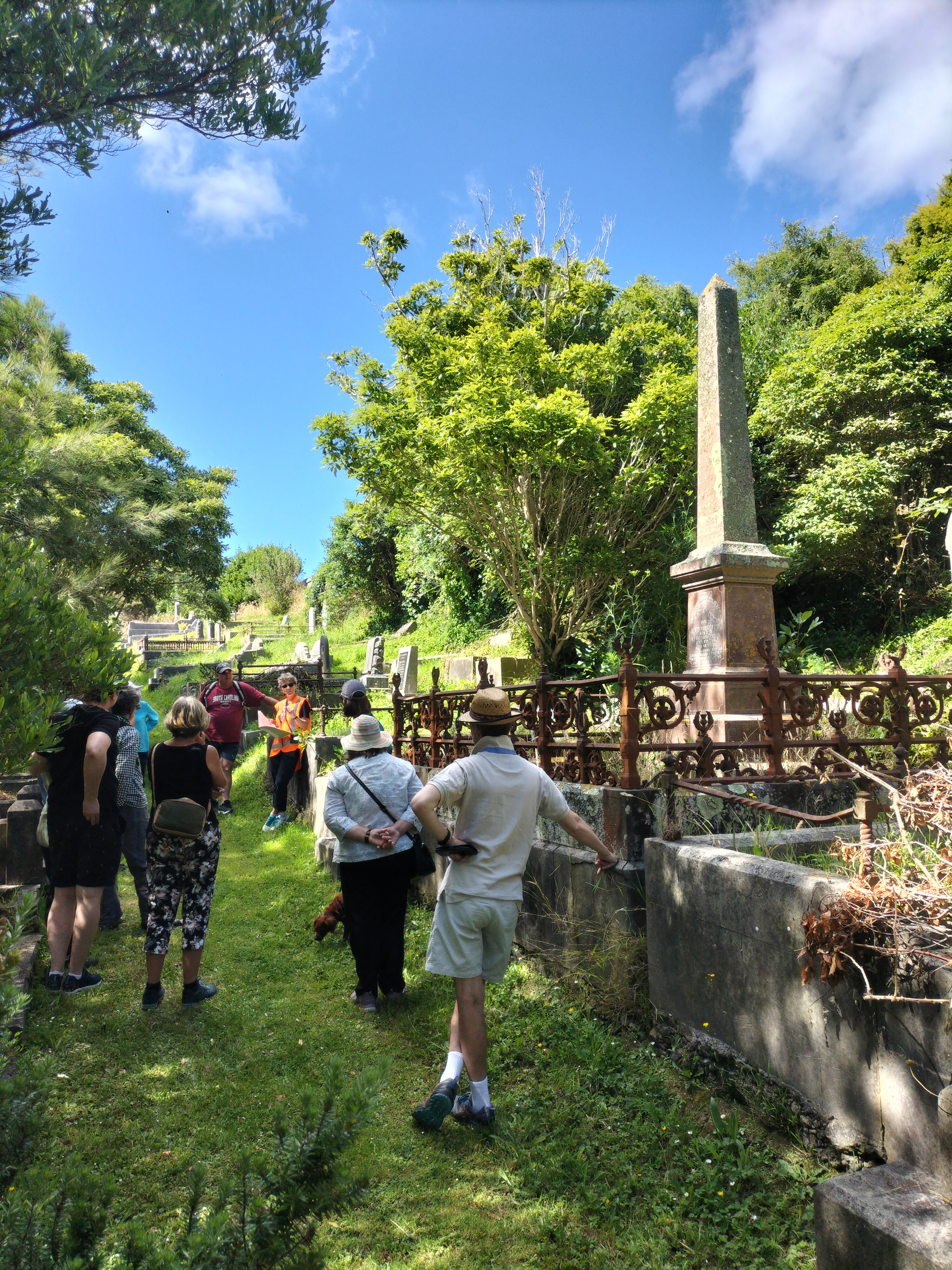
Cemetery tour in February 2023.

== Recreation ==
Bereaved people visit Karori Cemetery to hold services in the chapels, lay flowers, scatter ashes and so on, but the cemetery is also popular as an area for active recreational activities including walking and running, dog walking and cycling. Heritage-related activities are also popular: exploring the older and wilder sections, reading inscriptions and photographing gravestones and finding graves for genealogical interest. Friends of Karori Cemetery offer guided tours, or visitors may follow self-guided routes to points of interest around the cemetery.

Due to "disrespectful mountain biking behaviour where bikers have used graves as jump-offs" and conflict between cyclists and pedestrians on narrow paths, cycling and mountain-biking are restricted to wider paved routes through the cemetery and specifically signposted shared-use tracks. Cyclists are also encouraged to use tracks outside the cemetery.

== Points of interest ==
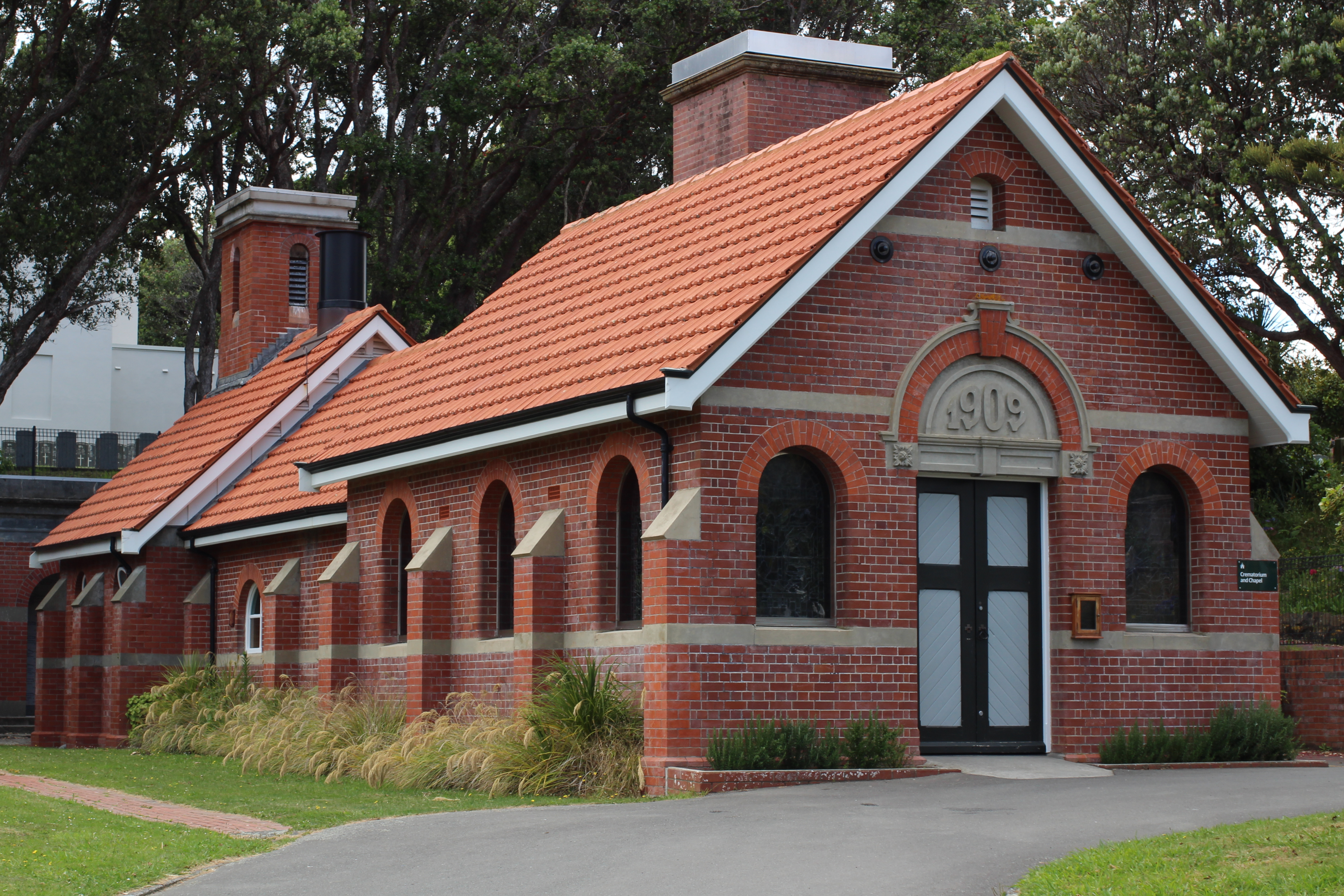
1909 crematorium and chapel

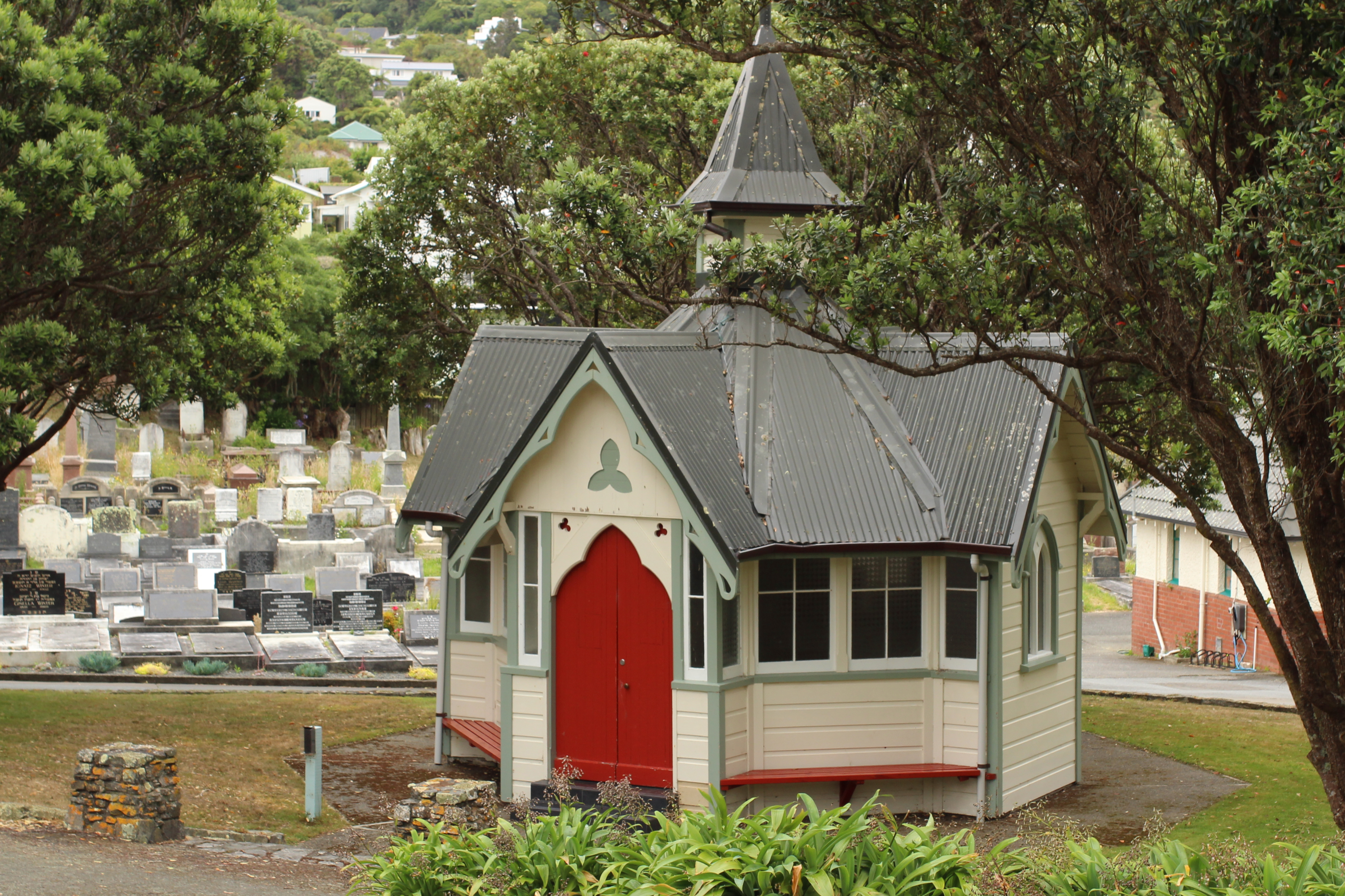
Shelter, aka Mortuary Chapel

=== Crematorium and historic chapel ===
The crematorium and chapel at Karori Cemetery were built in 1909 after years of lobbying by various citizens. The brick building in the Edwardian-Romanesque style was the first crematorium in New Zealand, and as of 2026 is still in operation. The furnace chimney was designed to look like a short bell tower. The chapel seats about 24 to 32 people. The building is notable for six stained glass windows in the chapel. The windows were made from 1914 to 1939 by the Dublin, Ireland glass company An Túr Gloine ('Tower of Glass'), and are considered to be the most significant group of windows produced by that company in existence outside Eire and Northern Ireland. Heritage New Zealand considers the windows to be the most important set of twentieth century imported windows of their kind in New Zealand. The crematorium and chapel are listed as a Category 1 Historic Place by Heritage New Zealand.

=== Main chapel ===
A new, larger chapel was opened at Karori Cemetery on 29 March 1959. When built, the chapel featured a tunnel which transported coffins to the crematorium 100 yards (91.4 m) away on a trolley running on overhead rails. The chapel is built of concrete and seats around 125 people.

=== Shelter ===
The Shelter (also known as the Mortuary Chapel or Jewish Chapel) was probably the second building erected at Karori Cemetery, after a sexton's cottage. It is a wooden Gothic Revival-style building notable for its unusual plan in the shape of a Greek cross (all four arms are of equal length). The building was originally a mourners' shelter with a tower and louvres but soon after its construction in 1891 a door and windows were added for protection from the weather. The shelter was the centrepiece of the new cemetery, with paths radiating out from it. The building was for use by all denominations, but by the 1950s most burials took place far from the chapel and it was not used by those mourners. It became known as the Jewish Chapel because of its location near the Jewish section of the cemetery and corresponding use mainly by Jewish families. In the 1950s the Wellington Jewish community took over maintenance of the building for some years, but in 1977 they moved to a new building at Makara. Wellington City Council then restored the structure.

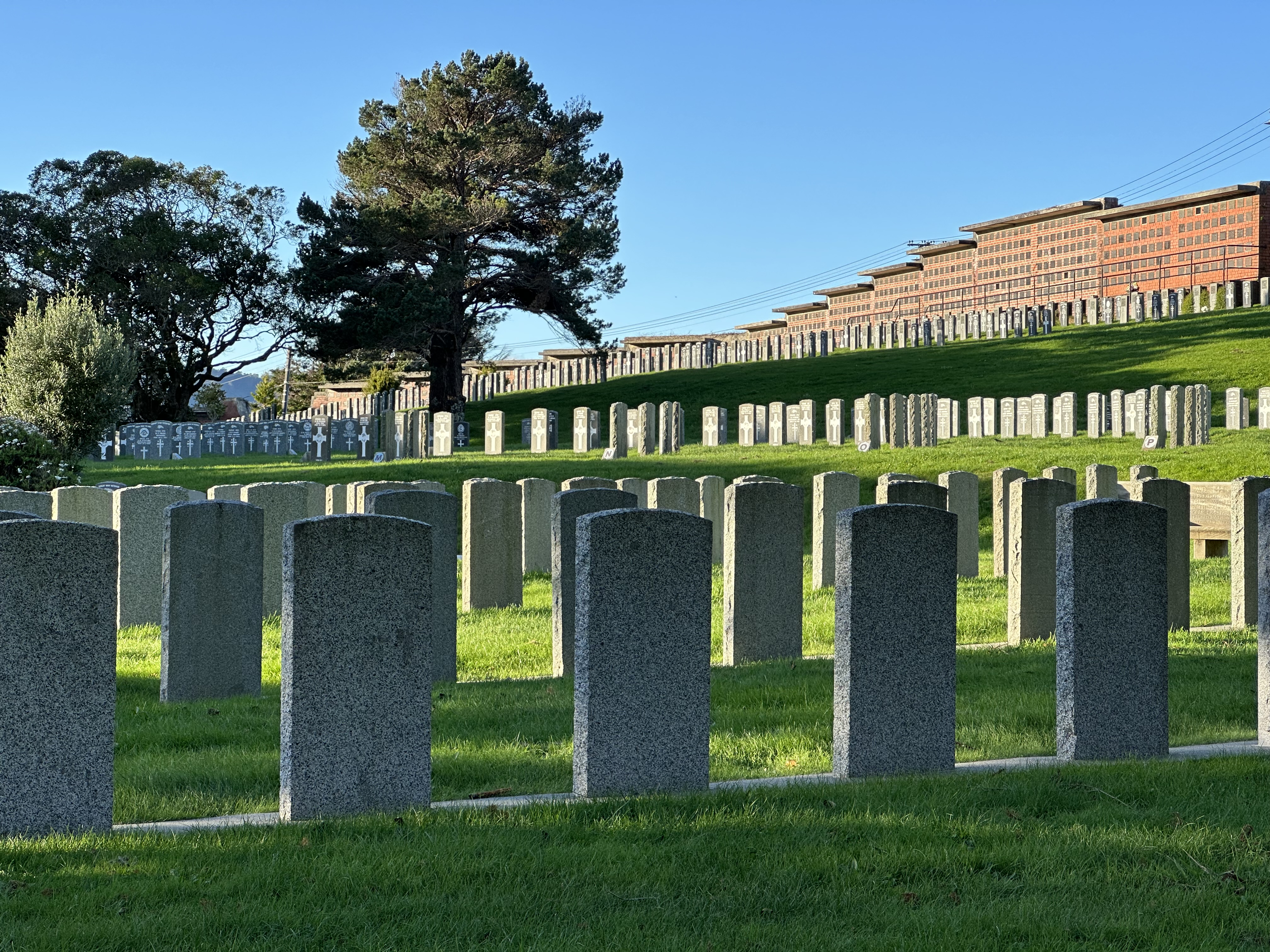
Soldiers' graves

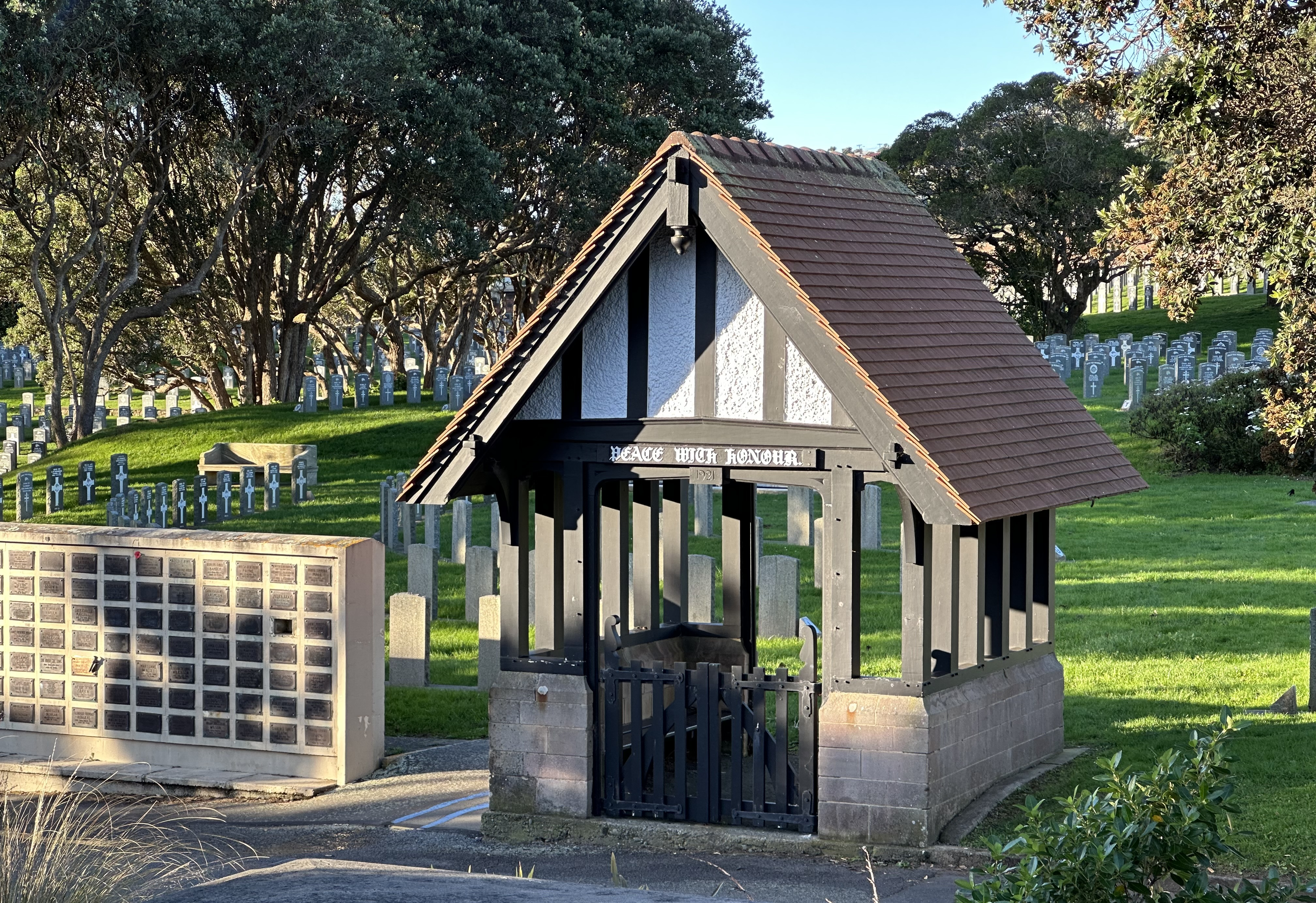
Lychgate, built in 1921.

=== Lychgate ===
The lychgate at Karori Cemetery creates a formal entrance to the Services burial area and also acts as a shelter. It was built in 1921 as a memorial to World War One soldiers, with funding donated by Ellen Hope-Lewis in memory of her husband and son. The lychgate is 3.0 x 2.7 metres in size. It is built of limestone blocks with wooden posts that support a wooden roof and half-timbered gables with stucco infill between the dark timber framing, showing an Arts and Crafts influence. The lychgate carries the inscription 'Peace with Honour'. The lychgate has a Historic Place Category 2 registration from Heritage New Zealand.

=== War graves ===
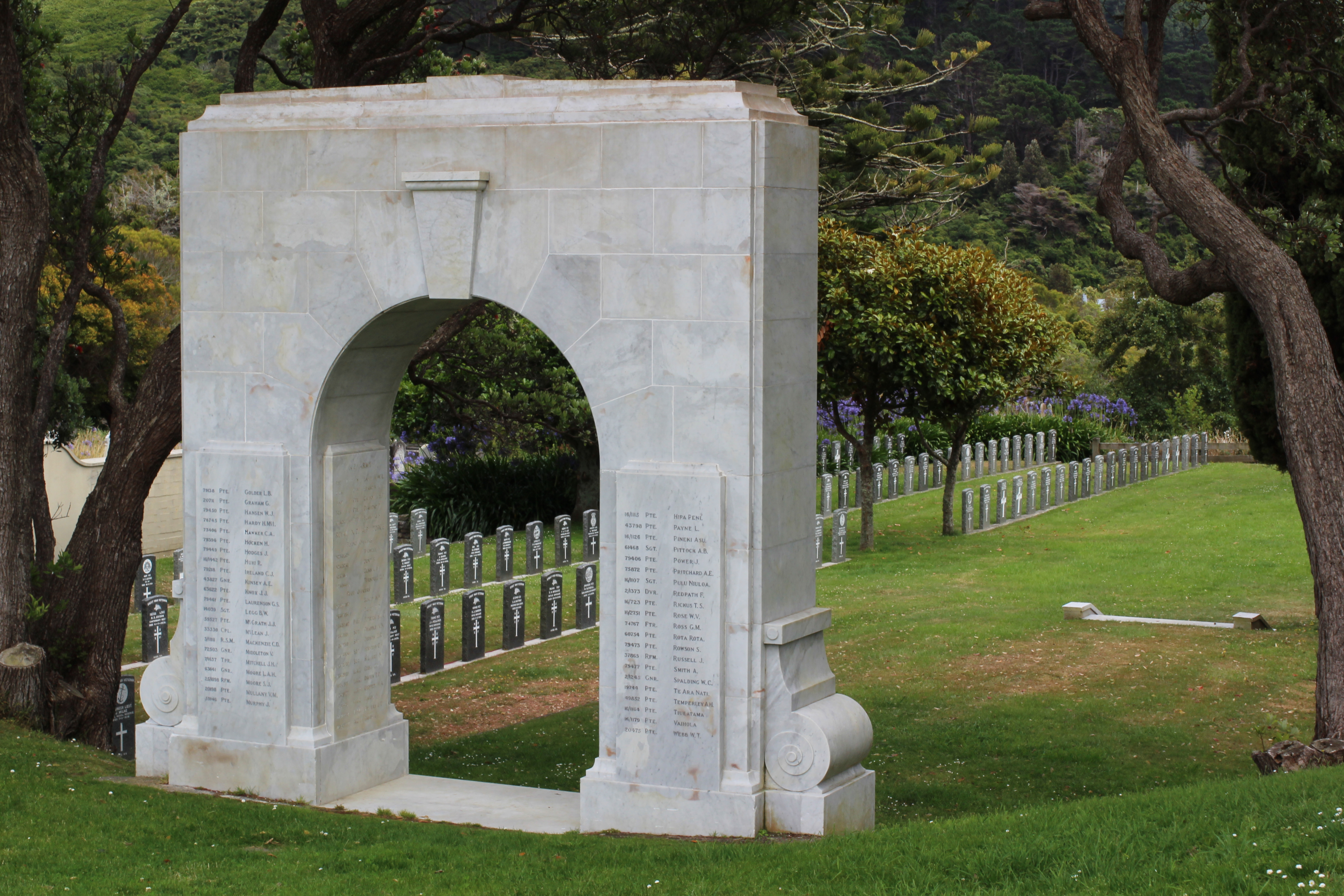
Wellington Provincial Memorial in 2025.

The cemetery contains separate World War I and World War II services sections, where 198 World War I and 100 World War II casualties are buried. A further 92 World War II casualties are buried in denominational plots elsewhere in the cemetery. Most men who died at the first New Zealand Expeditionary Force Reinforcement Camp at Trentham and the Upper Hutt Remount Depot are also buried at Karori.

The Commonwealth War Graves Commission (CWGC) erected a plaque commemorating 15 New Zealand World War II service personnel who were cremated at Karori Crematorium and had their ashes scattered in the cemetery. It is set into the Services Columbarium Wall in the services section.

==== Wellington Provincial Memorial ====
The two services sections are linked by the marble arch of the Wellington Provincial Memorial which was erected by H. Glover in 1931 with funding from Wellington City Council and the government. The arch is inscribed with the names of service personnel from Wellington Province (and later the southern half of the North Island, Marlborough, and Nelson) who died in the two World Wars and who have no known grave. The arch's original purpose was to commemorate "those members of the New Zealand Expeditionary Force belonging to the Wellington district who died and were buried at sea between New Zealand and the overseas bases", but in 1964 two panels were added listing 17 servicemen who died in or around New Zealand in World War II.

Prince Philip, Duke of Edinburgh, Karori Cemetery, 31 December 1953, a week after the Tangiwai disaster.

=== Tangiwai memorial ===
The Tangiwai disaster was a train derailment at Tangiwai on 24 December 1953 which killed 151 people. A service for 21 victims was held at Karori Cemetery on 31 December 1953; the Duke of Edinburgh attended. In 1957, the Tangiwai National Memorial was unveiled at Karori Cemetery. The memorial, designed by Government Architect Gordon Wilson, contains the graves of 16 victims of the disaster. Each grave is marked with a bronze plaque. Eight of the victims are unknown: their plaques read "Known unto God". At the head of the memorial a stone tablet lists all 151 people who died in the disaster.

=== SS Penguin disaster memorials ===
The SS Penguin disaster in 1909 was New Zealand's worst shipwreck of the twentieth century. 72 people died, and 40 of those were buried at Karori Cemetery after a mass funeral procession through the city. Fourteen concreted graves form the main Penguin memorial, and a smaller memorial in the Catholic section of the cemetery commemorates three crewmen from the ship. Other victims are buried in family plots at the cemetery.

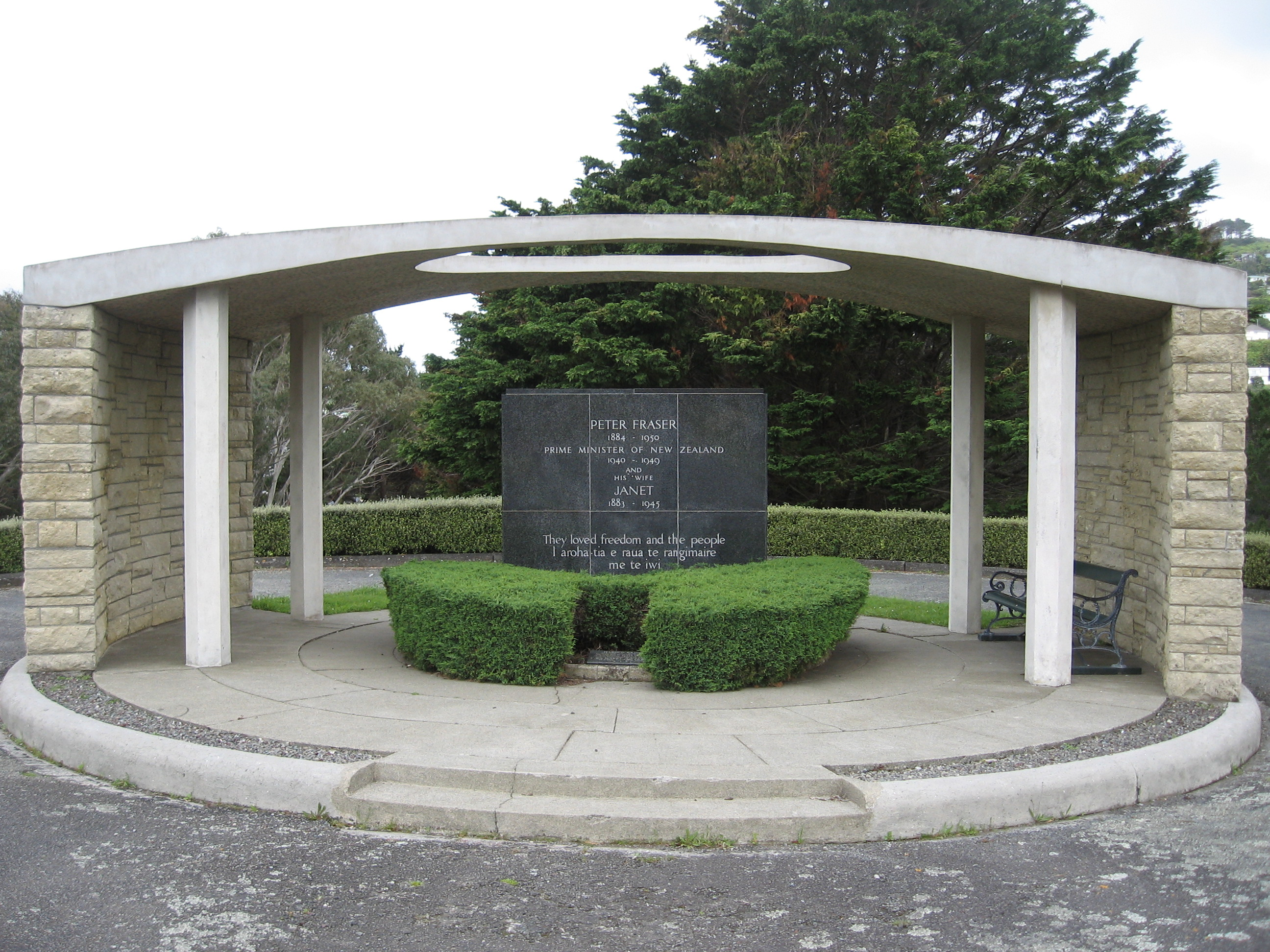
Peter Fraser Memorial

=== Peter Fraser memorial ===
Peter Fraser was Prime Minister of New Zealand from 1940 to 1949. He died in December 1950 and was buried at Karori Cemetery with a simple headstone. Discussion then took place about creating some sort of memorial to Fraser, and in 1952 the Labour Party launched an appeal for funds. The memorial was built to a design by Ministry of Works architect Barry Marshall and was completed in July 1956. It consists of an inscribed upright black granite stone 7 ft 6 high and 8 ft wide (2.28m by 2.44m), which is surrounded by curved walls of Hinuera stone supporting a roof with an oval opening in it. The memorial is located in the Church of England section of the cemetery.

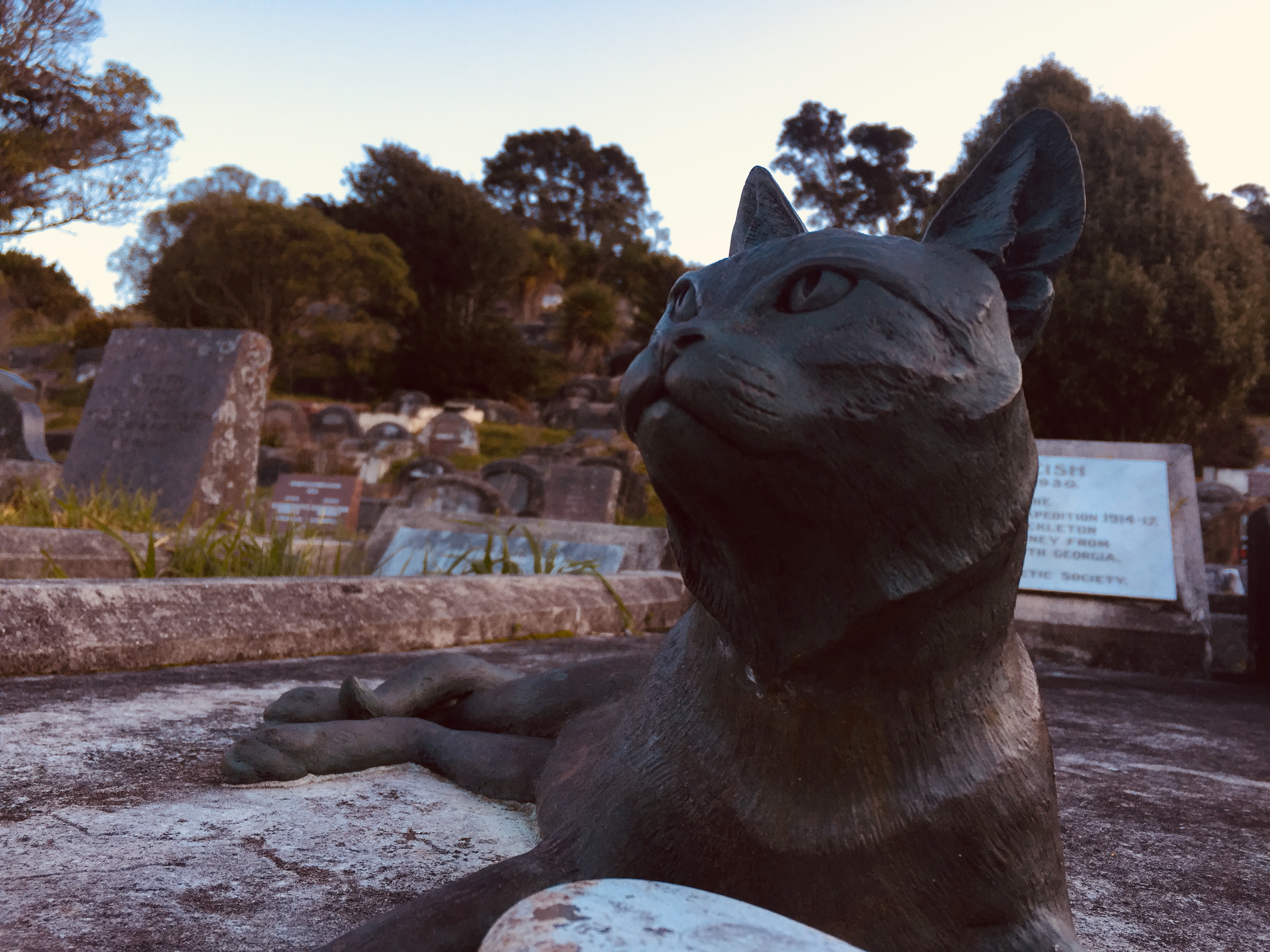
Mrs Chippy

=== Mrs Chippy ===
'Mrs Chippy' was a cat belonging to Harry McNish, a member of Sir Ernest Shackleton's 1914 Antarctic expedition who is buried at Karori Cemetery. Mrs Chippy and dogs belonging to the expedition were shot after the Endurance got stuck in the polar ice and the men had to take to lifeboats to seek safety. In 2004 a life-size bronze sculpture of McNish's beloved cat, Mrs Chippy, was placed on his grave by the New Zealand Antarctic Society. McNish's grandson, Tom, believed this tribute would have meant more to McNish than receiving the Polar Medal (McNish had been denied the Polar Medal after a dispute with Shackleton, and never forgave Shackleton for shooting Mrs Chippy.)

== Notable burials ==
- Lily May Kirk Atkinson (1866–1921), popular orator, suffragist and temperance worker – president of New Zealand Women's Christian Union 1901–1906; president of New Zealand Society for the Protection of Women and Children 1903–1911
- Suzanne Aubert the saint founder of the Daughters of Our Lady of Compassion (later translated to the motherhouse of the religious institute)
- Albert Henry Baskerville (1883–1908), Organiser of the famous All Golds tour to Great Britain and Australia
- William Thomas Beck (1865–1947), New Zealand Army officer and one of the first New Zealanders to land on Gallipoli on 25 April 1915
- Edwin Bezar (1838–1936), one of the last surviving New Zealand Wars veterans, author and public servant
- Euphemia Cunningham (1882–1989), World War I munitions worker and recipient of the Medal of the Order of the British Empire in 1918
- William Cunningham (1883–1959), senior officer in the New Zealand Military Forces and lawyer
- John Duthie (1841–1915), businessman and politician, including Mayor of Wellington (1889–1890)
- Peter Fraser (1884–1950), Prime Minister (with memorial)
- William Hardham (1876-1928), only Victoria Cross recipient from the New Zealand forces to receive it for service in the Second Boer War.
- John Hosking (1854–1928), judge of the Supreme Court
- Joseph Kinsey (1852–1936), businessman, collector, and philanthropist from Christchurch
- Cybele Ethel Kirk (1870–1957), educator, suffragist and temperance worker
- Harry McNish (1874–1930), member of Sir Ernest Shackleton's 1914 Antarctic expedition. He modified the small boat, James Caird, allowing it to fetch help for the rest of the crew
- Charles Morison (1861–1920), New Zealand barrister
- Thomas Orde-Lees (1877–1958), member of the 1914 Trans-Antarctic Expedition
- Elizabeth Pinfold (1859–1927), recipient of the Belgian Queen Elisabeth Medal
- Mary Player (c. 1857–1924), servant, midwife, welfare worker, feminist and social reformer
- Randolph Ridling (1888–1975), recipient of the Albert Medal for Lifesaving

== Friends of Karori Cemetery ==
The Friends of Karori Cemetery was incorporated as a charitable trust on 17 February 2021. Their purpose is to advocate for and develop the heritage and ecological values of Karori Cemetery, and to assist with grave/plot restoration. The Friends offer guided tours and undertake working bees in the cemetery, clearing weeds, cleaning graves and planting appropriate plants. They also research and publish stories of people buried in the cemetery.
