= Arthur Tompkins =

Arthur Tompkins may refer to:

- Arthur S. Tompkins (1865–1938), American politician and judge
- Arthur Tompkins (New Zealand judge), New Zealand lawyer, judge, and art crime expert
