= Fanny Cole =

Prominent member of temperance and women's rights movement in New Zealand

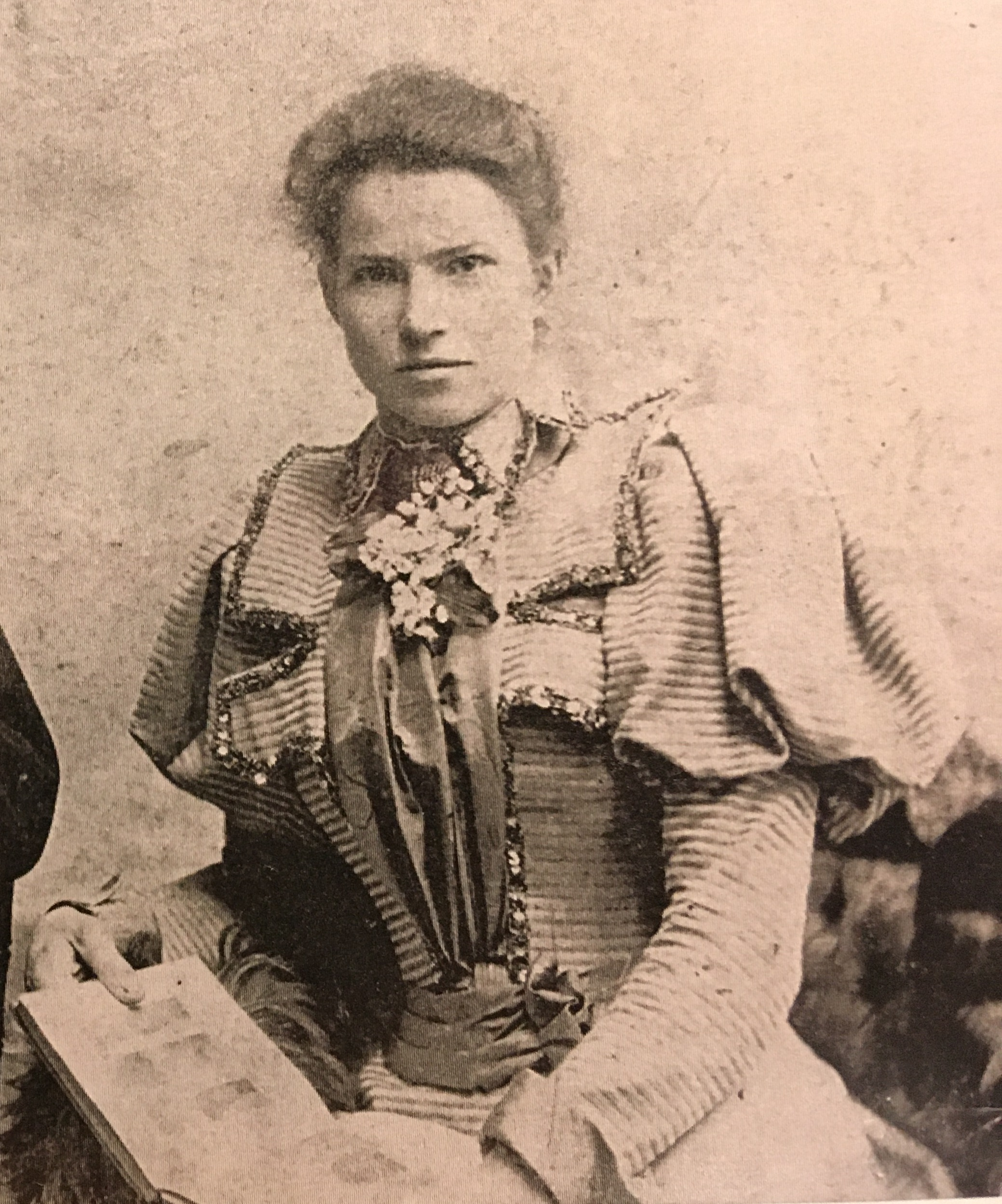
- Born: Fanny Buttery Holder; 20 June 1860; England
- Died: 25 May 1913 (aged 52); Christchurch, New Zealand
- Other names: Mrs. H. Cole
- Known for: women's rights and temperance activism
- Spouse(s): Herbert Cole, m. 1884
- Parent(s): Fanny Buttery and Charles Holder

Fanny Buttery Cole (née Holder; 20 June 1860 – 25 May 1913) was a prominent temperance leader and women's rights advocate in New Zealand. Cole was a founding member then president of the Christchurch chapter of the Women's Christian Temperance Union New Zealand (WCTU NZ) and national WCTU NZ superintendent of the Press from 1897 through 1903. In 1906 Cole was elected national president of the WCTU NZ, a position she held until her untimely death shortly before her fifty-third birthday.

== Early life ==
Fanny B. Holder was born at St. George's, Shropshire on 20 June 1860, the sixth of eight children of Fanny Buttery (1822–1883) and Charles Holder (1821–1895). Buttery was a surname of Huguenot origin and pronounced Beautrais. According to the England Census, Fanny and her siblings grew up in Wrockwardine Wood where her father worked as a bootmaker and served as the local Methodist preacher. Some of the family immigrated to New Zealand in 1880; and the four sisters lived near their parents in Christchurch, marrying in quick succession as their mother grew ill and died. The eldest Sarah Elizabeth Holder (1854–1939) married in 1883 a Methodist minister, Rev. Daniel James Murray (1851–1928). Lydia Ann Holder (1856–1929) married a carpenter Andrew Harre (1859–1908) in 1884. Jane "Jennie" Holder (1864–1921) married in 1885 Thomas Oliver Johnson (1861–1932), a farmer.

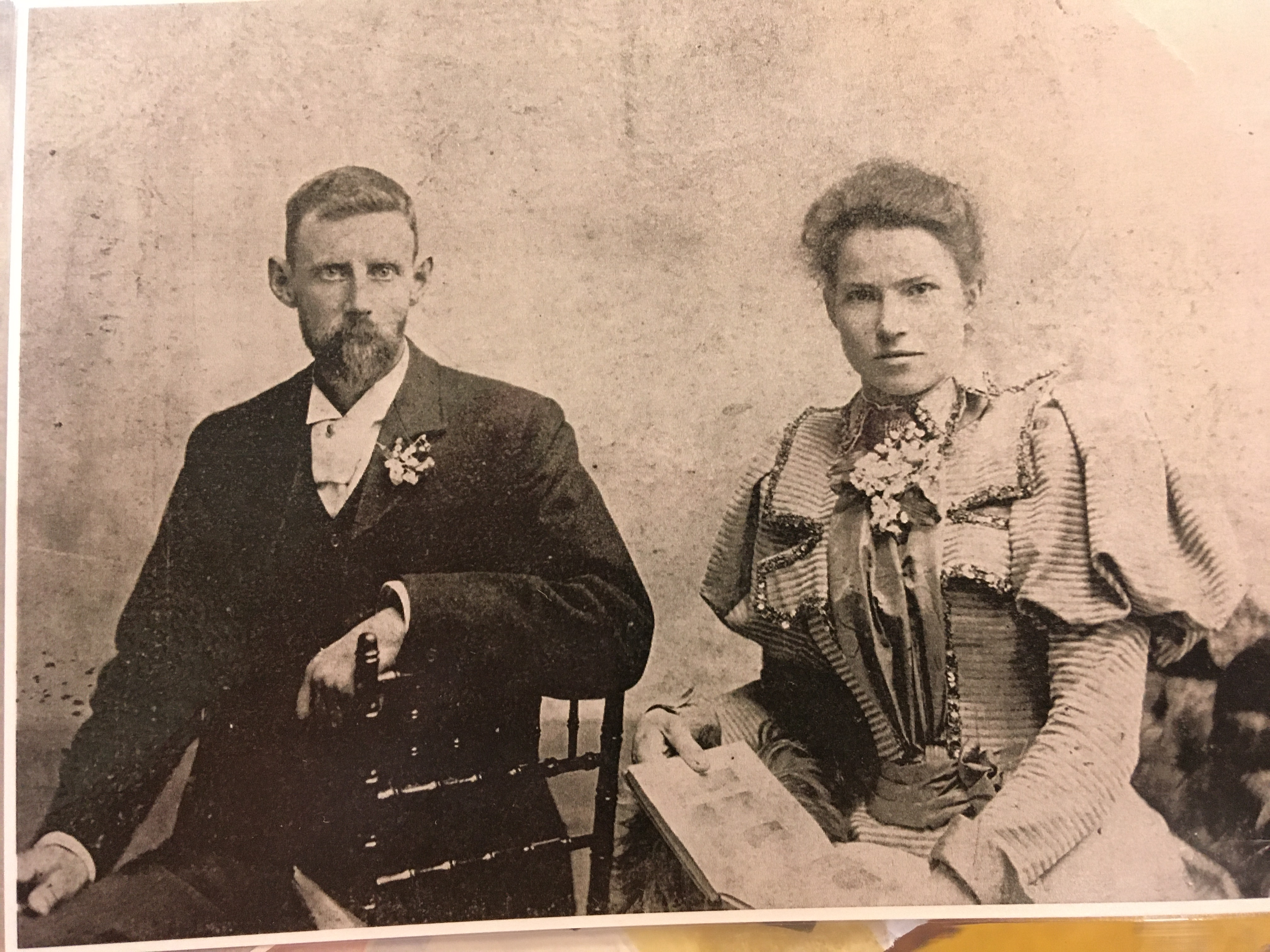
Herbert and Fanny B. Cole c1884

Fanny B. Holder worked as a teacher in Brookside and East Oxford public schools before she married in 1884 Herbert Cole of Kaiapoi (1858–1917). Herbert Cole was a temperance worker for the "no-license" option and an agent for the Canterbury Farmers' Cooperative Association. On 1 October 1886, their elder daughter Marguerita Lilian "Daisy" Cole was born in Richmond, on their estate called Ellengowan situated near the River Avon. The wetlands in the area were once called "Daisy Meadows." Their second daughter, Eleanor Charlotte "Nellie" Cole (1888–1962) was also born there on 4 July 1888.

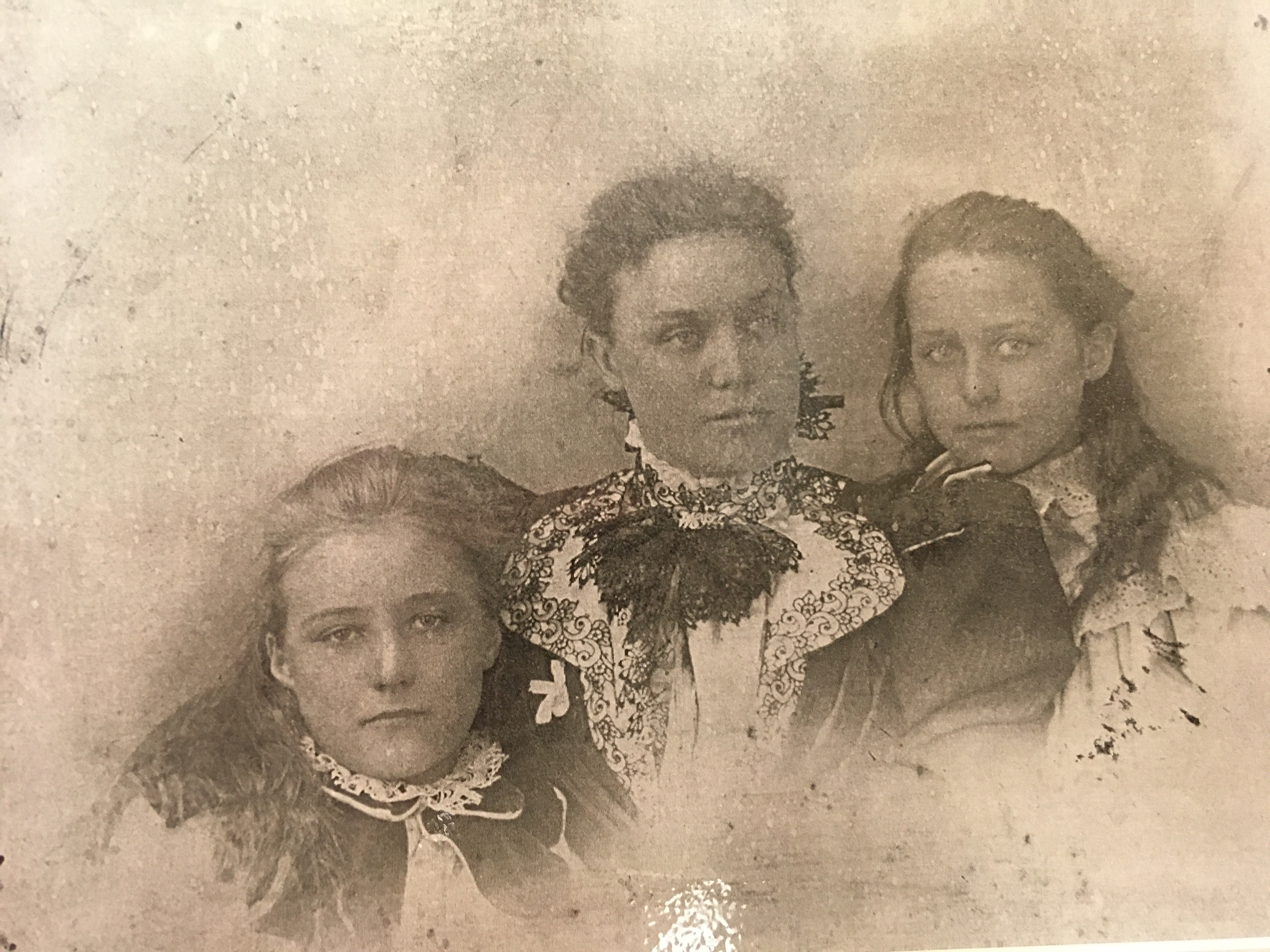
Fanny B. Cole with her daughters Daisy and Nellie

Her children were four and six years old in 1892, when Fanny Cole of Richmond, Christchurch signed the suffrage petition put forward by the Political Franchise Leagues and WCTU NZ. Cole had been part of the founding of the Christchurch Union when Mary C. Leavitt, the world organiser for the Woman's Christian Temperance Union, visited in May 1885. There were forty-four founding members who they elected Emma E. Packe, president; Cecilia Wroughton, treasurer; and, Kate Sheppard, secretary. Cole also signed the 1893 petition, the largest ever presented in the New Zealand Parliament, and which led to the successful acquisition of women's right to vote at the national level. They were still living at Ellangowan in Richmond according to the electoral rolls of 1896, but by 1894 Herbert Cole had started up a land agency business partnership with temperance activist Thomas "Tommy" E. Taylor. By 1900, according to the electoral roll of Lyttelton, the Cole family had moved to the Port Hills area overlooking the Lyttelton Harbour.

== Temperance and women's rights leader ==
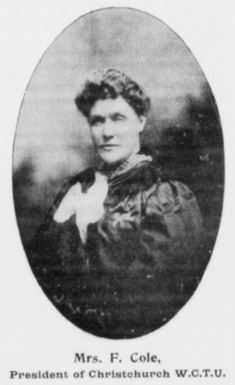

Since 1897, Fanny B. Cole was elected vice president of the Christchurch Union. The many activities undertaken by the Union that year included the establishment of coffee rooms to compete with alcohol-centric restaurants and hotels, a luncheon booth at the Agricultural & Pastoral Association Show that held hundreds of patrons, cottage meetings with Bible study in Linwood, registering factory girls to be able to vote, rescue work for young girls on the streets, and petitioning Parliament to reform the Juvenile Depravity Bill to include boys and not just girls. That year she and Kate Sheppard signed, as representatives of the Christchurch WCTU along with other Christchurch leaders such as Ada Wells, a public letter to the Premier of New Zealand. They sought equal powers with male official visitors to gaols – to be granted powers of Justices of the Peace. "It is little use having women as official visitors to our jails, unless they have the same powers as men visitors."

That same year during the presidency of Annie Jane Schnackenberg of Auckland, Fanny B. Cole started working for the national WCTU NZ as superintendent for Press Work. By the next year, Cole was elected over incumbent Kate Sheppard as president of the Christchurch Union, a position she held until her ascendancy to the national presidency of the WCTU NZ. She was hailed for her leadership skills which included "conciliatory, tactful methods of procedure," and that meetings "were specially noticeable for the absence of anything approaching friction."

=== WCTU NZ president, 1906–1913 ===
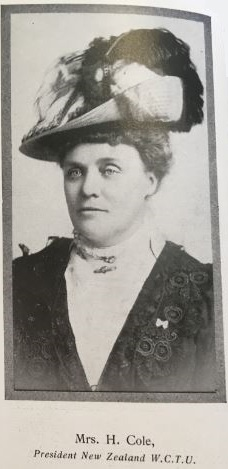

==== 1906 WCTU NZ convention ====
At the 1906 WCTU NZ convention conducted March 20–26 in Greymouth, hosted by the Anglican Church at Trinity Hall, Fanny B. Cole was elected national president. She was not present at this meeting – Mary Sadler Powell of Invercargill, Rachel Hull Don of Dunedin, and Lily May Kirk Atkinson of Wellington (the current president) removed their names from nomination in favor of the Christchurch Union's nomination of Cole – her candidacy was unanimously won. Cole formally accepted the role by letter.

Even before she was elected national president, Cole was working on representing all of the WCTU NZ at the Christchurch International Exhibition. The goal was to show how various the work of the Unions, "under its all-embracing Do-Everything policy." Cole was invited to be on the platform at the opening ceremony, and she was sure that this was evidence of a "change in public sentiment with regard to Temperance. ... Assuredly the women of New Zealand banded together in the W.C.T.U. are now recognised as a force to be reckoned with in the political world." However, the part of the Exhibition that garnered space in the Official Record was "The Children's Rest," a building that accommodated a crèche for as many as sixty young children and babies per day. The Education Minister, Sir George Fowlds wrote to her to thank the WCTU for their efforts at the Exhibition, especially in organising the Creche.

==== 1907 national convention ====
The twenty-second Annual Convention was held in Christchurch, February 14–20, 1907. Cole presided over the meetings and resulting resolutions showed her strong convictions – similar resolutions from the previous and following conventions under her leadership. The resolutions emphasized: anti war, anti-violence, remove disabilities hindering women from sitting as members of Parliament or other offices, protest against legalization of the Totalisator, creation of separate homes in rural areas with farms for men and women arrested due to a deficiency of sexual control; abolish the time limit of charges of criminal offences against girls; remove legal disabilities affecting illegitimate children; teach Scientific Temperance in schools; create economic equality of husband and wife – including restrictions on women's time and labour contained in Factory Acts; and, equal wages for equal work.

There were several hints in The White Ribbon about Cole's declining health from 1905 on. And, at the 1907 national convention in Christchurch and the celebrations at the International Exhibition, she excused herself after the formal business. "... the severe indisposition which seized her immediately after the garden party upset all her plans for the further entertainment of those delegates to the Convention." That year, too, her daughter Marguerite (aka "Daisy") Lilian Cole became business manager of the White Ribbon – and began accompanying her mother to conventions.

==== 1908 national convention ====
At the 1908 convention in Auckland, Cole could not speak for several moments after a particularly poignant presentation by two little girls dressed in temperance white. She said afterwards that she was overcome with grief, thinking of all the children at risk from the violence of drink and the liquor traffic. Hera Stirling, a former Salvation Army officer and currently an Anglican missionary from Pūtiki, spoke eloquently about her work among the Māori in the Hawke's Bay, Waikato and Wanganui districts – and petitioned for the WCTU NZ to set aside funds specifically for Māori-related projects. The Auckland Star reporter noted in the summary of the meeting that the response to Stirling was positive (the delegates found her story "most distressing") though no action was taken. On Cole's way home to Christchurch after the convention, she was interviewed by "Dominica" for a Wellington newspaper about the WCTU's national efforts underway. Cole emphasized the campaign to abolish the Totalisator allowed in the Gambling Bill and that the Union chapters had gathered together 36,000 signatures to send as a petition to Parliament. She also spoke on the "legal disabilities of women and the economic independence of wives," e.g., the mother having no legal right to her child or say in keeping the home over her head. "... The Women's Union acts on the broad principle that it is woman's duty to oppose everything that is likely to injure the home or the interests of the home."

==== 1909 national convention ====
The 1909 national WCTU NZ convention meetings were held in the Baptist church on Vivian Street in Wellington. It included two formal visits: one to the Hon. George Fowlds Minister of Education on the successes of scientific temperance instruction, and one to the Premier Sir Joseph Ward to continue the fight against the Contagious Diseases Acts, inherited from the Parliament of the United Kingdom which promulgated men's use of prostitution and abused all women's rights when at any moment any woman could be accused of harboring a venereal disease. That year Cole and the WCTU NZ Canterbury District hosted a visit in Christchurch from the American WCTU missionary Katharine Lente Stevenson during their convention. Stevenson and Cole, both passionate advocates for scientific temperance and women's rights, quickly became good friends in that time which Stevenson called "our week of close comradeship." Cole attended the Australian Triennial Convention in Sydney that year in May to great acclaim by the Australian WCTU.

==== 1910 national convention ====
Cole presided over the twenty-fifth national WCTU NZ convention at Invercargill in February 1910. The presence of Hera Stirling "and other Maori Sisters at the Invercargill Convention and the part they played in the various gatherings, brought the native work prominently before the members of the Convention." This kicked off a formal effort at fundraising specifically for the support of Māori Unions with Mrs. E.H. Henderson serving both as WCTU NZ superintendent of Māori Work and of Māori Fundraising. At the 1910 convention, in addition to the usual resolutions for women's rights and economic justice, the delegates resolved that they would take advantage of new Municipal Act, which for the first time allowed both men and women ratepayers to nominate and vote for members to Hospital and Charitable Aid Boards. They also recommended that every Union form a "Y. Union, a Loyal Temperance Legion and a Cradle Roll" to reach out to youth and young mothers in a more sustainable way. That year the Contagious Diseases Acts were finally repealed by Parliament, and Cole credited the WCTU NZ with winning a fight against the "Social Evil" that had been going on since their very first national convention in 1886. The WCTU NZ leaders had "agitated for this repeal for many years and our members may certainly claim that their strenuous efforts have been the means of keeping this matter before Parliament and the Cabinet Ministers, until justice has been done to the women of this Dominion."

==== 1911 national conventions – New Plymouth and Pakipaki ====
1911 started with Cole spending "some weeks in a private hospital" but announcing that she would still travel to the national convention in March at New Plymouth and stand for re-election as president. The White Ribbon described the Convention of 1911 to have a record attendance of seventy-six delegates – and the national roster consisting of 2668 "paid up" members. Resolutions that year included a protest against Great Britain's opium traffic in China, and a vote of thanks to the New Zealand government for agreeing to post Temperance Wall Sheets in all public schools and to teach scientific temperance as a compulsory subject. Cole was re-elected president. Also at this convention, the delegates determined to hire another national organiser, in addition to the current organiser, Jean McNeish (later Gibbons). The new organiser would focus primarily on supporting and building out Māori Unions – an endeavor that had been underway for many years and recently boosted by Hera Stirling, an Anglican missionary before her marriage to Rev. Munro in 1910. A committee met to organise the work to be undertaken by the new Māori Organiser, Miss Rebecca Smith of Hokianga, in preparation for the convention in Pakipaki.

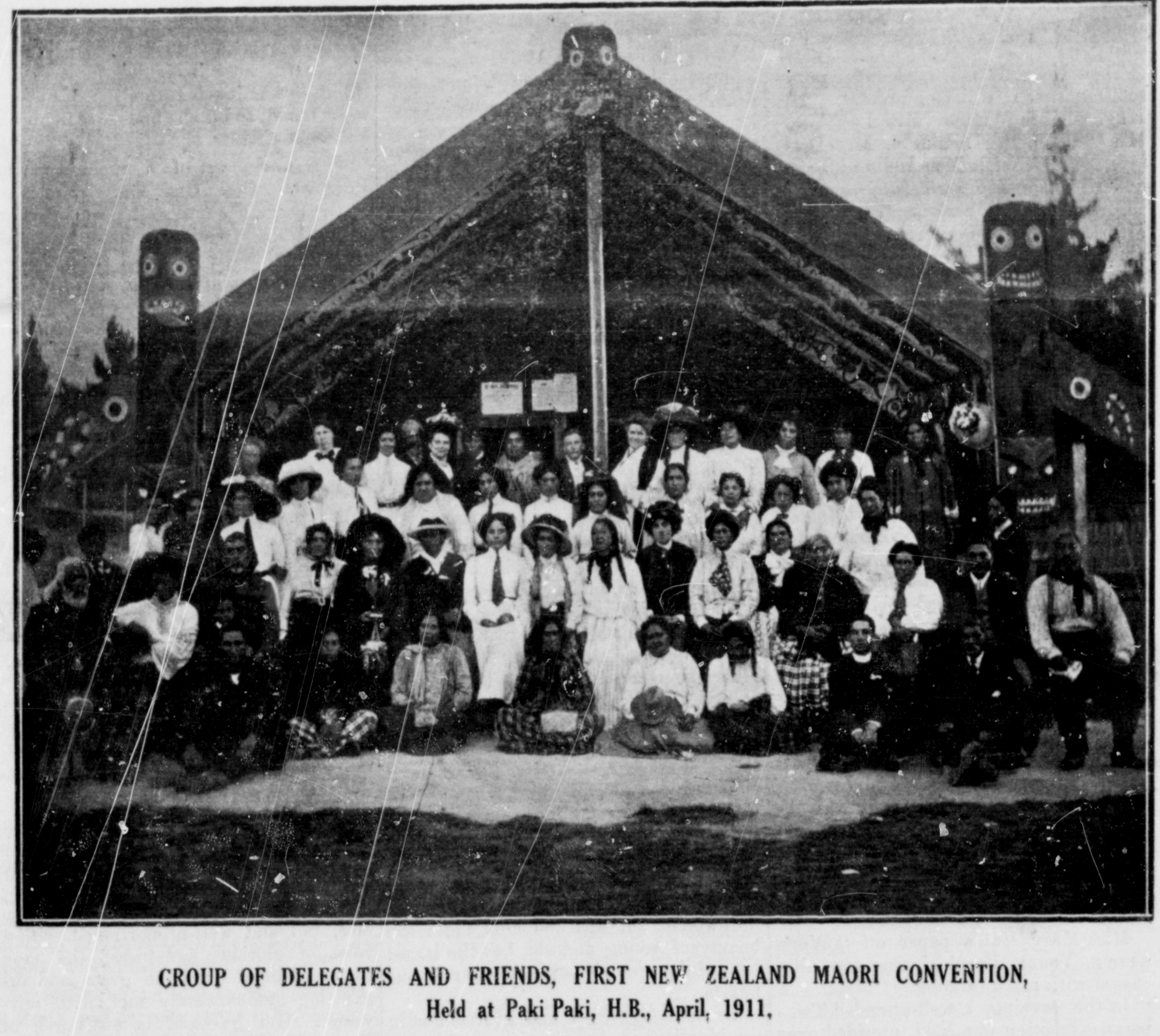

Cole and Lily Atkinson worked with Hera Stirling Munro of Rotorua, Jean McNeish of Cambridge and Rebecca Smith of Hokianga to organise the first WCTU NZ convention dedicated solely for Maori Unions. It was held at Pakipaki near Hastings, Hawke's Bay, April 10–14, 1911 – Cole and Atkinson planned to present at the convention together with leading Māori missionaries and temperance activists from all parts of the country. This area was a stronghold of the Māori Anglicans and cemented close ties between the Māori WCTU NZ leadership and the Young Māori Party. Sixty-five delegates representing seven WCTU NZ Unions conducted the business meetings, and hundreds of visitors attended the public meetings and feasts. Though she had promised Hera Stirling Munro the year before that she would attend, Cole wrote a letter that was read at the convention that she had been "very near the gates of death," and so she was still not strong enough since the Invercargill convention to travel again so soon after her trip to New Plymouth. The opening ceremony, after a church service in the Paki Paki Hall led by Archdeacon David Ruddock, included speeches by Mohi Te Ātahīkoia, Mrs. Mohi (president of the local Union), Mrs. Tamehana, Mrs. Wharekape, Mr. Puhara, Hera Stirling Munro/Manaro, and Mrs. Kopua. The WCTU NZ response came from Mrs. H.E. Oldham of Napier (the business manager of The White Ribbon), Vice President Lily Atkinson, and World WCTU missionary Bessie Harrison Lee Cowie. The delegates decided to create a Māori District Union within the WCTU NZ with Hera Stirling Munro/Manaro elected President and Matehaere Arapata Tiria "Ripeka" Brown Halbert as Vice President. The convention was a high point in the decade-long process of inclusion of Māori in the WCTU NZ. A report early the next year by Mrs. E.H. Henderson of Waikato, WCTU NZ superintendent and treasurer for Māori Work, showed that 44 Unions had been formed with a membership of some 600 men and women.

==== 1912 national convention ====
Cole's steadying hand was seen with the WCTU NZ reaction to the large vote polled for National Prohibition – 56% for it, though not enough to win the day since a 3/5 majority was needed for it to carry. The twenty-seventh annual convention held at Dunedin March 14–21 opened with 75 delegates present for a lecture on the increasingly popular topic of Eugenics and a speech on the values of moderation by the President of the Dunedin Reform Council. Cole responded carefully in opposition with a demeanour considered "gracious, sweet, and womanly," by saying "We mothers are not here to protect monopolies, but men." Cole's presidential address included a controversial stance against moderation in her plea for empathy with the suffragettes in England, insisting that:

Force was first used by the men who opposed the suffrage, and force has been met by force in this case. ... We are not defending such extreme measures, but those agitators won their point after a display of force terrible in its effects. Many contend that the women of Great Britain are injuring their cause by a display of force mild in its effects compared with that used by men in days gone by, who won for their class a right to a share in the Government of the country. The fact is clear that the militant suffragists have made their cause what it never was before, a power to be reckoned with. They are citizens, and as citizens who are denied justice, they are battling for what they value far more than comfort, ease, luxury, or the approval of their friends. Fines, imprisonment, injury to health and limb, even death itself, have been borne by women in this great cause for justice and right. Let us never utter a disparaging word of them or their methods. We, who won the franchise by peaceful tactics, because our public men were just and chivalrous, have no right to question the methods of these sisters, who are fighting with the backs to the wall for a share in the Government of the country, as a means of improving the condition of life for those who sit in darkness, and in the show of death, their sisters and ours.

Cole also supported the convention's resolution protesting the recent Defence Act by stating:

"the military authorities have placed in their hands so much power, that we are in danger of liberty of conscience, and liberty of thought, becoming things of the past in a country where the inhabitants are supposed to be the freest on the face of the earth." She wrote to Sir Robert S. Baden-Powell, founder of the world-wide Scout Movement, to get his support for allowing boys under 18 in New Zealand to substitute participation in the Scouts for the Cadet system.

Cole played a large role in the Canterbury Provincial Convention of 1912 held at Kaiapoi in which she pushed for resolutions against the "so-called Sports Protection League" which was in favor of mechanising the totalisator, a large display board for betting at horse tracks. Cole was elected the District president.

==== 1913 national convention ====
The sixty-four delegates who attended the national convention at Nelson March 5–13, 1913, noticed that Cole "looked somewhat frail after her recent illness." They gave her a "great ovation" when she rose to speak about the important legacy of Nelson's women's rights advocate Mary Ann Wilson Griffiths Müller and Total Abstinence leader Alfred Saunders. Her presidential address was a passionate statement for women's rights in many different arenas. She particularly focused on the debates over national prohibition, and she hoped that those opposed to prohibition would "consider the rights of the wives, mothers, and children of their deluded victims, who have been robbed of the comfort of home, food, and clothing in order to keep the publicans' coffers full ... Artificial protection for a trade that is the most prolific source of crime, vice, and misery is subversive of all that is just and right." Cole was re-elected as president. Cole's last official act was drawing up and signing a circular letter as issued by direction of the Convention that the WCTU NZ disapproved of the platform of the Bible in Schools League and for the various church leaders to stop fighting over this issue.

== Death and legacy ==
On 25 May 1913, at her home at Cashmere Hills, Fanny Cole died – only fifty-two years old. Her burial procession on 28 May included the Christchurch Mayor and City Council among the large attendance. Rev. Leonard Isitt, by then a Member of Parliament, spoke about Cole's commitment to temperance and beyond that to all forms of social and economic justice for all women and children. A memorial service was held on June 1 at the Sydenham Methodist Church, of which she had been a member.

Delegates of the Canterbury Provincial Convention in October 1913 voted to call for funds to create a national memorial to Fanny Cole. The most they ended up doing was to create a memorial stone at her grave in Linwood Cemetery, Christchurch – the stone was unveiled and dedicated with a large procession during the 1915 convention in 1915.

In addition, the Christchurch WCTU NZ donated £150 in Cole's honour to be invested, with the interest used to provide prizes for the Temperance Examinations. The prizes were known as the Fanny Cole Memorial Prize.

After Fanny Cole's death, Herbert Cole married his second wife in 1915: Amy Jane Alley, a teacher in the North Canterbury District. The Cole daughters married after both their parents' deaths, but neither had children of their own. Nellie, the younger daughter at 33 years of age, married Henry McMaster in 1921 (then after his death, she married Charles James Hawker in 1944); and, Daisy at 36 years of age married Archibald "Archie" James Hodges in 1922. Their step-mother, Amy Jane Cole (1868–1944) remarried in 1926 to Edward Thomas Mulcock.

== See also ==
- Alcohol in New Zealand
- List of New Zealand suffragists
- Temperance movement in New Zealand
- Women's Christian Temperance Union New Zealand
