= Priscilla Crabb =

New Zealand temperance activist (1864–1931)

Priscilla Crabb JP
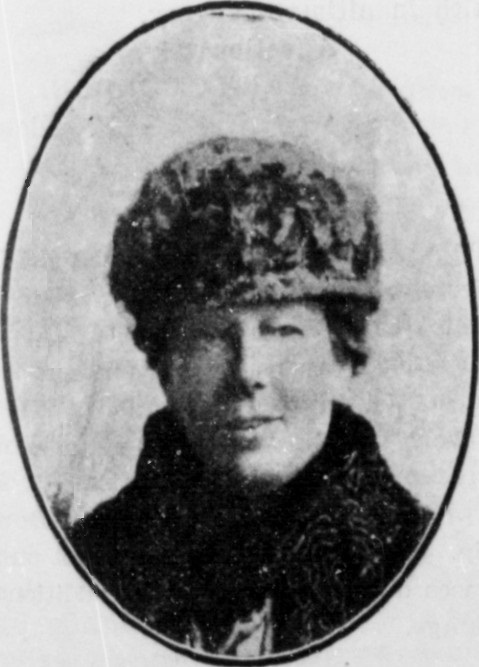
- Crabb in 1926
- Born: Priscilla Kennedy; 1 December 1864; Franklin, Tasmania, Australia
- Died: 27 June 1931 (aged 66); Palmerston North, New Zealand
- Other name: Prisca Crabb
- Known for: humanitarian works, temperance activism, acting president of Women's Christian Temperance Union New Zealand
- Spouse: Ernest Hugh Crabb
- Relatives: Helen Crabb (daughter); Lance Tompkins (grandson); David Tompkins (great-grandson); Arthur Tompkins (great-great-grandson)

Priscilla Crabb JP (née Kennedy; 1 December 1864 – 27 June 1931) was a New Zealand temperance activist and community leader. For over a decade, she was a vice president of the Women's Christian Temperance Union of New Zealand (WCTU NZ), and she was acting president in 1920. She was one of the first women elected to the Palmerston North Hospital Board, and in 1928 she became the first woman in Palmerston North to be appointed a justice of the peace. While president of the local WCTU NZ chapter, she founded in 1917 an orphanage and refuge for mothers, the Willard Home (named after Frances Willard), which continues today on the same site as a rest home for the elderly.

== Early life and family ==
Priscilla "Prisca" Kennedy was born in Franklin, in the Huon Valley of Tasmania, Australia, on 1 December 1864. Kennedy migrated to New Zealand in her early twenties, and in 1891 she married Ernest Hugh Crabb (1867–1931), a grain merchant and storekeeper. Their first baby, Helen Crabb, was born on 24 November 1891 at Halcombe. Helen, later in life going by the name Barc, became an artist and art educator. Their other children were: Marjory (or Margerie or Margery) Doris Crabb, later McMeekan (1894–1993); Millicent Clare (or Constance) Susan Crabb, later Pearce (1898–1996); Lilian Laura Crabb (1893–1978); Eileen Winsome Crabb (1896–1982); and Houlton Hugh Ernest Crabb (1900–1975).

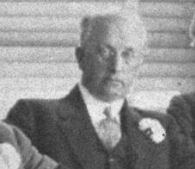
Ernest Hugh Crabb, Palmerston North Borough City Council 1918

Crabb had always wanted to be an artist, and she took her children with her on painting trips in nature.

According to the New Zealand post office directories, the growing family lived on a farm at Waituna West, then Rewa, in the Manawatū-Whanganui region. By 1907 they lived in Kimbolton and Ernest Crabb was a justice of the peace in Feilding. In 1911, they moved to Palmerston North.

== Temperance and charity work ==
By 1913, Crabb was elected president of the Palmerston North chapter of the Women's Christian Temperance Union New Zealand (WCTU NZ), a position she held continuously until 1923. She was also a member of the YWCA Board, and she was elected to the College Street School committee as well as being elected one of the first women members of the Palmerston North Hospital Board. Since 1885, by law the Hospital Board served as the principal source of distribution for public welfare efforts in Palmerston North.

In 1915, there was some discussion over whether the national convention for the WCTU NZ should be postponed on account of the war. Crabb wrote an editorial in the WCTU NZ's White Ribbon insisting that the country needed the WCTU NZ more than ever to push for alcohol legislation. She also saw the WCTU NZ as crucial in educating women for political roles. She wrote:

"Our churches teach general principles. The Union teaches them to apply these principles in practice against the great moral evils that have come down to us through all the ages."

Her report at the Wellington Provincial Union Convention that year included notice that the Palmerston North club had organised a war committee that worked with the Red Cross League to provide supplies and funding for the war effort. At that meeting she, as president of the Palmerston North Union and vice president of the provincial union, had led the convention in the absence of president Kate Edger Evans and was duly elected president.

The report from the 1916 Palmerston North WCTU annual meeting indicated that the club—with Crabb as president as well as superintendent of moral instruction—had 162 paying members. They held two meetings every month as well as a sewing meeting weekly for relief work. They had 100 sandbags made as part of their patriotic work, and provided help to the St John Ambulance and hospital ships. They sponsored a cooked food stall and tearoom at the All Nations' Fair that year and donated £74 to the Patriotic Society. The club also sponsored a writing competition focused on the topic of scientific temperance. The winning essay in 1916 by Elsie Gawith, Form VI in high school, was published in the White Ribbon.

=== Willard House, Palmerston North ===
The Palmerston North Union chose a building on Fitzherbert Street as a site for a home to accommodate an alcohol-free location for relatives of soldiers at the New Zealand Medical Corps Awapuni training camp to stay when visiting. The house was staffed and ready for soldiers' wives and families on 9 October 1917. Given that a medical corps was stationed at Palmerston North, sometimes numbering as many as four hundred, there was a demand for a safe place for the servicemen's wives and children to stay. Married men were given leave to visit their families at Willard House overnight. The house could accommodate as many as fifteen families.

After the war, the home was adapted to a children's home: officially named the Manawatū Willard Children's Home and Orphanage. The seven-room house sat on a property of five acres at Russell Street, and it could accommodate up to twenty children (from toddlers to twelve-year-olds) and two residential staff. Their funding relied on the national WCTU NZ and local Unions' work at weekly sales of produce, food plants and sewing; surrounding local county councils; public entertainments where tickets sold provided cash (e.g., the 1920 Oratorical Recital, sponsored by the Caledonian Society and promoted by the Citizens' Lunch Club); sale of brick cards by school children to support renovations; jumble sales; and, donations of second-hand clothing and furniture. For Crabb, the purpose included an aim to halt the system of children being boarded out to families who needed the extra income earned per week per child from the local authorities. By 1926, Crabb was in negotiations with local government to sell some of the surplus land for building a school. Crabb served as president of the Willard Home for eight years. The Willard Home continued until 1964 when it was sold to the Presbyterian Social Services Association. The home is now known as Willard Elderly Care.

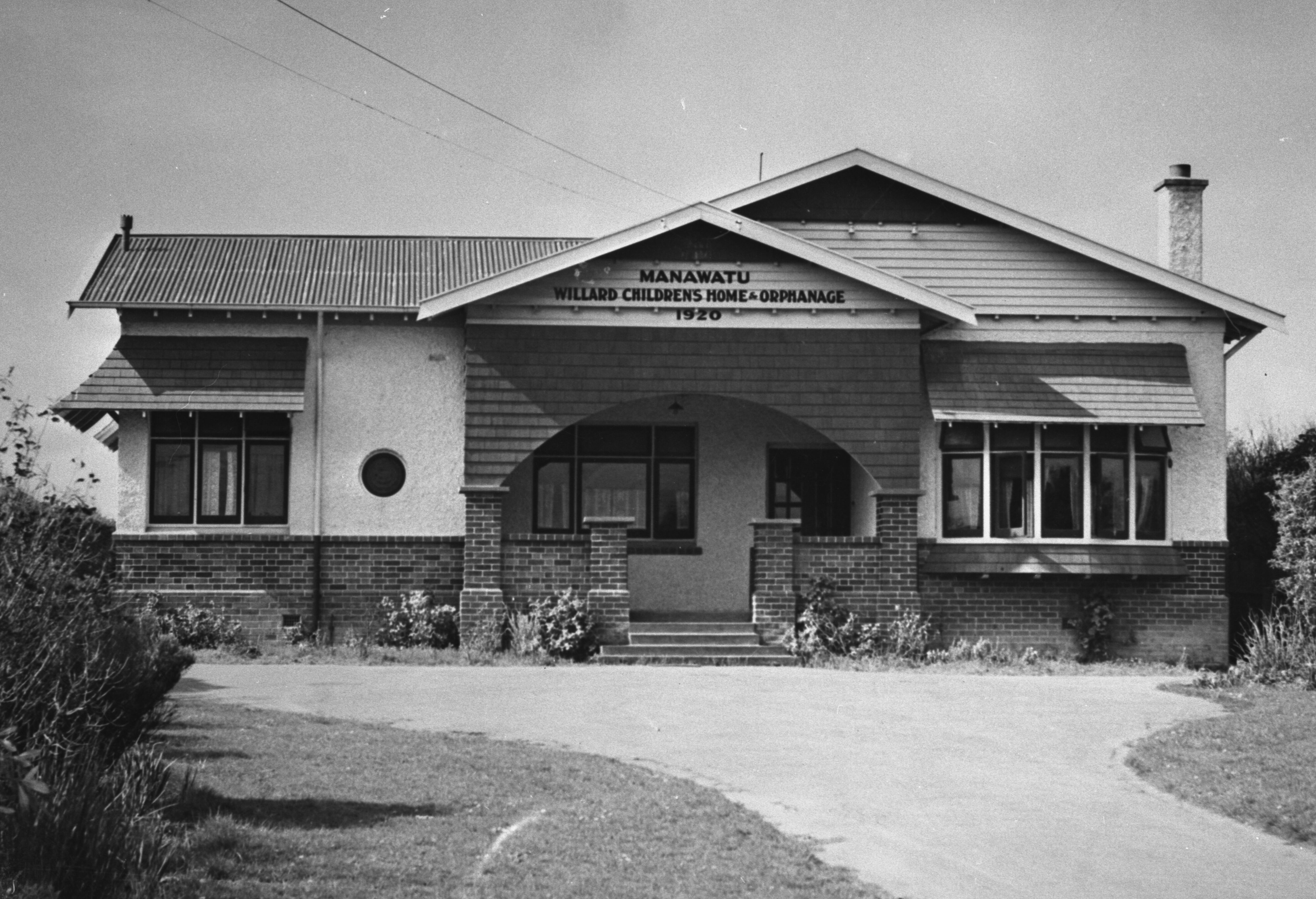
Manawatū Willard Children's Home, Palmerston North c1939

== National leadership in WCTU NZ ==
At the annual meeting of the WCTU NZ in Auckland in March 1917, Crabb was elected national vice president to serve under president Rachel Don.

Crabb was still national vice president in 1920, and in May that year she became acting president. WCTU NZ president Rachel Don underwent hydrotherapy treatment then travelled abroad for nearly a year during which she attended the World Woman's Christian Temperance Union convention. Crabb served as acting president until March 1921. In the meantime, Crabb led the 35th Annual Convention of the WCTU NZ held in Wellington from 10 to 18 March 1920. Her presidential address covered the political events and scope of the influenza outbreak of the previous two years, work for prohibition and sex education, and the status of women's suffrage and temperance work globally. She also called for a resolution to celebrate the passage of the Women's Parliamentary Rights Act that allowed for women to be elected to national office.

== Illness and death ==
In 1928, Crabb was appointed a justice of the peace, the first woman in this position in Palmerston North. She had retired from her role as president of the Willard Home that year. However, she continued in her patronage of the home. Her last public appearance was to attend the Willard Home birthday party. She died unexpectedly at home on 27 June 1931, and according to her obituary was survived by five of her children: Helen Crabb, who was teaching art at the Sydney Presbyterian Ladies' College in Australia; Marjorie "Doris" Crabb, who was working at Massey College; Lillian Laura Crabb, mistress of the Kopuku School; Millicent Constance "Sue" Crabb Pearce; and Houlton Hugh Crabb, an electrical engineer. Another daughter, Eileen Winsome Crabb, was not mentioned. Crabb's furniture was listed in an announcement of auction by her estate, giving a sense of the comfortable type of home she had made during her lifetime. Crabb was also survived—only by a few months—by her husband who died on 5 October 1931. They are buried together in the Kelvin Grove Cemetery in Palmerston North.

== See also ==
- Temperance movement in New Zealand
