= Grant Hammond =

New Zealand jurist and law professor (1944–2019)

The Honourable Sir Grant Hammond KNZM
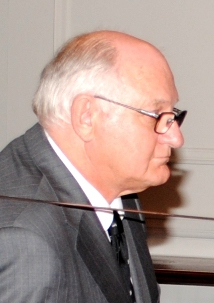
- Hammond in 2011

President of the New Zealand Law Commission
- In office 2010–2016

Justice of the Court of Appeal
- In office 2004–2011

Judge of the High Court of New Zealand
- In office 1992–2004

Judge of the Supreme Court of Samoa
- In office 2010–2019

Personal details
- Born: 14 May 1944 Waipawa, New Zealand
- Died: 31 May 2019 (aged 75)
- Spouse: Nanette Moreau

Sir Robert Grant Hammond KNZM (14 May 1944 – 31 May 2019) was a New Zealand jurist and law professor. He was a judge of the New Zealand Court of Appeal during which time he was also president of the New Zealand Law Commission and chair of the Legislation Advisory Committee to Parliament. He published a wide range of books and legal texts and was one of the top law reform experts in the Commonwealth.

== Early life ==
Born in Waipawa on 14 May 1944, Hammond grew up on a dairy farm near Te Awamutu, and was educated at Te Awamutu College where he was head boy in 1962. In 1962–63, he was an AFS exchange scholar at Wethersfield High School in Kewanee, Illinois.

== Legal career ==
Before his appointment to the judiciary, Hammond was made a partner in New Zealand law firm Tompkins Wake & Co in his early twenties. He was also a professor of law at a number of American, Canadian and New Zealand universities, as well as serving as the chairman of a Canadian law reform agency and as director of The Institute of Law Research and Reform at the University of Alberta.

Hammond was appointed to the bench of the High Court of New Zealand in 1992 and as a judge of the Court of Appeal of New Zealand in January 2004. Sir Grant then spent a nearly a decade as a judge of the Court of Appeal where he presided over a number of important civil and criminal appeals. In 2010 he was appointed a judge of the Supreme Court of Samoa. In the same year he took up the presidency of the New Zealand Law Commission and chair of the Legislation Advisory Committee to Parliament.

In the 2011 Queen's Birthday Honours, Hammond was appointed a Knight Companion of the New Zealand Order of Merit, for services to the law. He was the recipient of the Robert S Campbell Fellow at Magdalen College of Oxford University in 2008 and in 2014 was made a Distinguished Fellow of Victoria University of Wellington along with Sir Geoffrey Palmer.

== Legal education and teaching ==
Hammond graduated with a Bachelor of Laws and a Master of Philosophy in history from the University of Auckland. Later he obtained a Master of Laws from the University of Illinois and a Doctorate of Laws from the University of Waikato.

Hammond spent much of his early teaching career as a law professor throughout North America. In 1989 he returned to Auckland and was appointed a professor of law at the University of Auckland where he subsequently became Dean of Law. He was also professor of judicial studies and dean of law at the University of Waikato.

The complete list of law schools where he taught includes:

- University of Illinois
- Dalhousie University
- Cornell University
- Victoria University of Wellington
- Waikato University
- University of Alberta
- University of Auckland
- Magdalen College of Oxford University

== New Zealand Law Commission ==
During his time at the Law Commission, Hammond oversaw the completion of a number of controversial reports on a range of issues. These included media reporting of suicide, victims of family violence who commit homicide, and the creation of a separate crime of non-fatal strangulation.

== Death ==
Hammond died on 31 May 2019.
