= Helen Crabb =

New Zealand artist and art teacher (1891–1972)

- Born: 24 November 1891; Halcombe, New Zealand
- Died: 5 March 1972 (aged 80); Wellington Hospital, New Zealand
- Style: Pen and ink drawings
- Relatives: Priscilla Crabb (mother); Lance Tompkins (nephew); David Tompkins (great-nephew); Arthur Tompkins (great-great-nephew)

Helen Priscilla Crabb (24 November 1891 – 5 March 1972), also known as Helen Barc, was a New Zealand artist and art teacher, known for her expressive pen and ink drawings of people and animals.

== Life and career ==
She was born in Halcombe, Manawatu/Horowhenua, New Zealand on 24 November 1891. She was the eldest of six children of Priscilla Crabb (1864–1931) and Ernest Hugh Crabb (1867–1931). The judge Lance Tompkins, father of judge David Tompkins, was her nephew.

Crabb attended Wanganui Girls' College. After moving to Palmerston North with her family, she took evening classes in art and sculpture at the Palmerston North Technical School. In 1913 she moved to Sydney to attend the Sydney Art School where she studied under Julian Ashton. In 1916 she moved to England where she attended the Royal College of Art, joined the Women's Royal Voluntary Service, and spent time serving in wartime occupations. In 1920 she moved back to Sydney where she continued studying at the Sydney Art School.

From 1923 to 1930 she worked as an art teacher at the Presbyterian Ladies' College, and later worked at other schools and undertook part-time work including journalism. She continued to practice her own art and often exhibited with the Sydney Society of Artists.

After returning to New Zealand in 1943, she moved to Wellington and adopted the surname Barc, which was "Crab" spelled backwards, and took on arts students. Her pupils included Betty Clegg, Avis Higgs and Elva Bett. She exhibited regularly at the New Zealand Academy of Fine Arts, and wrote articles for the New Zealand Listener and Art in New Zealand magazines. In 1949 she held a joint exhibition with Evelyn Page, Cedric Savage, Helen Stewart and other well-known New Zealand artists.

She painted in watercolour at the start of her career but later worked in pen and ink and occasionally oil. The Dictionary of New Zealand Biography says of her work:

Her lively, evocative drawings of people (and occasionally animals) eating, sleeping, sitting about or playing, demonstrated a strong and original talent and an ability to penetrate the character of the subject with a few lines.

In 1959 after receiving an inheritance she returned to Australia, attended the Hobart Technical College for two years and continued to live and work in Hobart until 1969, when she returned to New Zealand. She died in Wellington Hospital on 5 March 1972.
