= Lance Tompkins =

New Zealand jurist (1895–1977)

Lance Tompkins QC
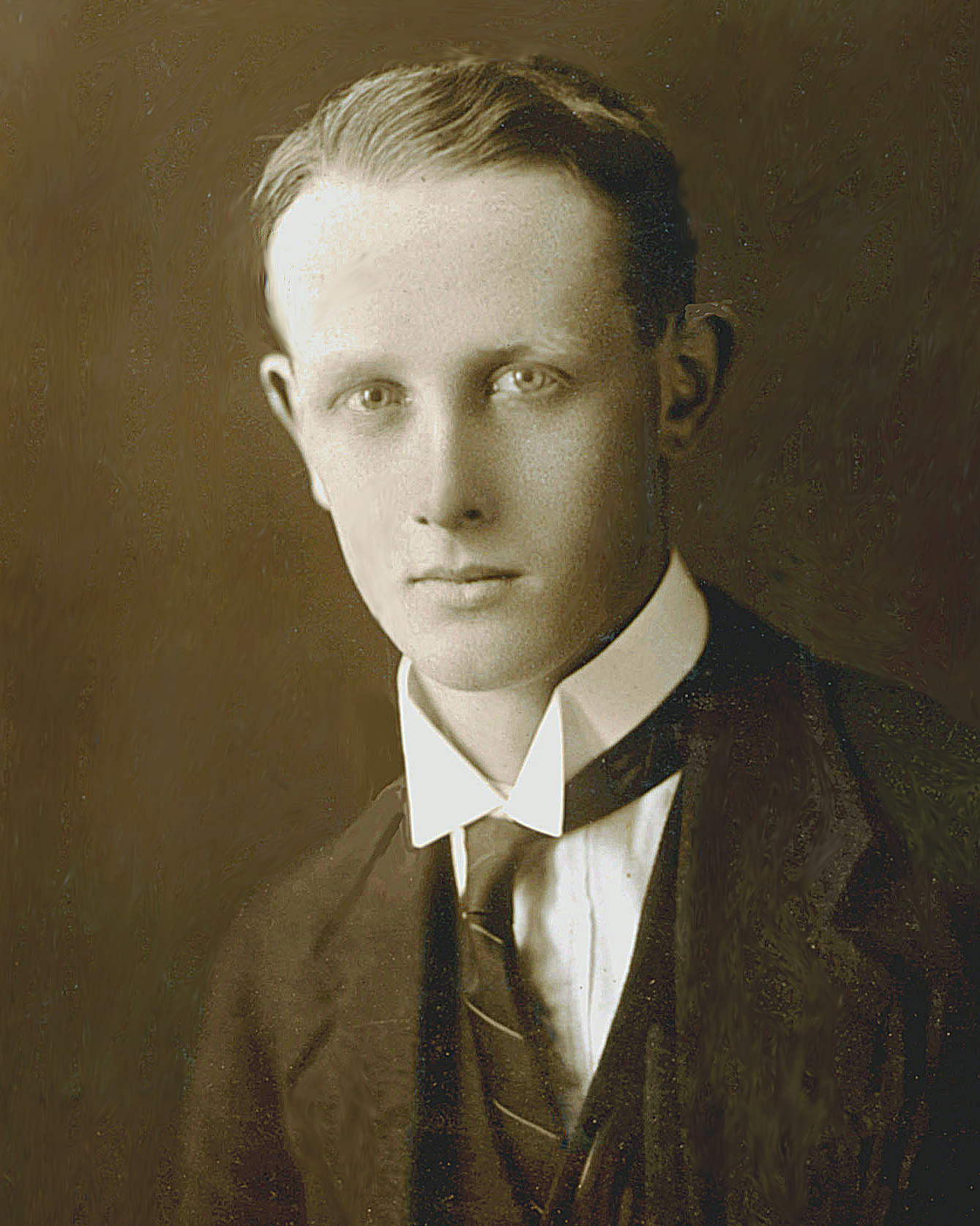
- Tompkins in 1915

Supreme Court judge
- In office 2 August 1963 – 1969

Hamilton City Councilor
- In office 1955–1958

Personal details
- Born: Arthur Lance Tompkins; 18 December 1895 Kimbolton, New Zealand
- Died: 22 January 1977 (aged 81) Taupō, New Zealand
- Spouse: Marjorie Rees Manning (m. 1926)
- Relatives: David Tompkins (son); Helen Crabb (aunt); Priscilla Crabb (grandmother); Arthur Tompkins (grandson)
- Occupation: Lawyer

Arthur Lance Tompkins QC (18 December 1895 – 22 January 1977) was a New Zealand judge. He was a founding member of the Hamilton law firm Tompkins Wake.

== Early life and education ==
Tompkins was born in Kimbolton in the Manawatu region of New Zealand. The artist Helen Crabb was his aunt. On 7 April 1926, he married Marjorie Rees Manning at St Peter's Cathedral in Hamilton. She was the daughter of Arthur Edwards Manning, the former mayor of Hamilton. At the time, Tompkins lived at Tuhikaramea, a locality south-west of Hamilton.

Tompkins studied law extramurally at the Auckland Law School. His studies were interrupted by World War I; he served in France where he was gassed and suffered a hearing impairment. After the war, he went to Auckland to finish his degree. He graduated in 1921 and received his degree from the University of New Zealand.

== Career ==
Tompkins served as president of the Hamilton District Law Society and was a member of the New Zealand Law Society Council, 1940–42. He was elected a Hamilton City councillor in 1955 and served until 1958. He was admitted to the Inner Bar as Queen's Counsel on 13 May 1958. He was appointed a Supreme Court judge on 2 August 1963, retiring in 1969.

A prominent figure in Hamilton, Tompkins held a number of roles including: president of Birthright Hamilton, 1958–1961; founding trustee and president, in 1961–1962, of the Waikato Savings Bank; chairman of Bartholomew Timbers Ltd, 1938–1963; member of the Board of Governors of the Waikato Diocesan School for Girls, 1934–1963; and president and life member of the Hamilton Golf Club. He also served as a judge of the Court of Appeal of Fiji and chairman of the Legal Aid Authority.

== Death and legacy ==
Tompkins died at Taupō on 22 January 1977. His son, David Tompkins, and grandson, Arthur Tompkins, both became judges.
