= Jessie Hiett =

Prominent member of women's rights and temperance movement in New Zealand

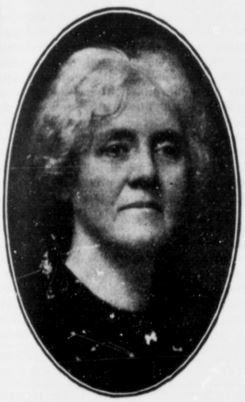
- Jessie Hiett circa 1938
- Born: Jessie Ann McKenzie; 14 April 1874; Milton, New Zealand
- Died: 14 September 1962 (aged 88); Dunedin, New Zealand
- Known for: Humanitarian works, international peace and temperance activism
- Spouse: William Henry Hiett (m. 1900; died 1935)
- Parent(s): Jane Sinclair and Murdoch McKenzie

Jessie Ann Hiett (née McKenzie; 14 April 1874 – 14 September 1962) was a New Zealand temperance activist. A Baptist deaconess for thirty years, she was president of the Dunedin chapter of the Women's Christian Temperance Union New Zealand (WCTU NZ) from 1916 to 1955, and meanwhile served as vice-president at the national level from 1926 to 1934 and again between 1946 and 1949. She was elected president of WCTU NZ in 1935 and served for ten years. Her most notable contributions at the national level was to lead the fight against the government's supplying of World War II troops with alcohol, maintaining the six-o'clock closing of public bars, and against the alcohol trade in the "dry" King Country.

== Early life ==
Jessie Ann McKenzie Hiett was born in April 1874 in Milton, New Zealand, formerly known as Tokomairiro. She was the third of five children of Jane Sinclair and Murdoch McKenzie. Her parents had married in 1868 in New Zealand and lived in a small fishing village southwest of Dunedin in Otago, Taieri Beach, where they owned a store and a farm.

In 1900 she married William Henry Hiett (1867-1935) who had recently migrated from England. They settled in Oamaru together where she became a Deaconess of the Baptist Church, visiting and nursing the sick and poor while her husband became an umbrella maker. She led services for the Young Ladies' Bible Class, participated in the Charitable Aid Board, and supported the temperance efforts of the "No License Association". They moved to Dunedin in 1913 where she took stronger roles in the temperance movement by joining the Women's Christian Temperance Union New Zealand (WCTU NZ).

== Leadership in Women's Christian Temperance Union of New Zealand ==
Jessie Hiett was the president of the WCTU NZ Dunedin Central Union continuously from 1916 to 1955. That year the local chapter took charge of what became a District Union (later called the Otago District Union) that organised, mentored and regularly visited with the WCTU NZ branch Unions in North East Valley, Oamaru, Sawyers Bay, Port Chalmers, Balclutha, Kaitangata, South Dunedin, and Kaikorai. She served as Dunedin District President from 1916 to 1929. During this time the Dunedin Central Union organised speeches for girls during lunch hour at their factories together with other Prohibition meetings, for a total of twenty-four public meetings held in 1923, not counting the drawing-room meetings held in private homes. Hiett organised an Otago District Convention in 1923 that produced resolution and petitions in line with WCTU NZ goals: scientific temperance instruction in public schools, remove political disabilities of women (especially the role of Justice of the Peace, serving on juries, becoming a member of the police force). They agreed to petition that defaulters on the maintenance for wives and children be compulsorily employed and wages garnished. They agreed with the national WCTU NZ that a day of peace and arbitration be celebrated in every Union. They planned to petition Parliament to enforce the anti-alcohol law in King Country; and, that any law regarding venereal diseases include that treatment be voluntary and free. Under Hiett's leadership, Dunedin hosted the WCTU NZ national convention of 1925 at which Rachel Hull Don was re-elected president.

On 26 August 1925, Hiett's mother died. Jane Sinclair McKenzie had lived a full life volunteering at church and participating in the Dunedin WCTU. This loss must have galvanised Hiett who then at the Otago District Convention in October 1925 gave a strong speech for national Prohibition as a crucial step in human progress.

When Don stepped down as WCTU NZ president in March 1926, Elizabeth Best Taylor of Christchurch took up the presidency. Taylor nominated Hiett as Dominion Vice-president, leading to her election in this role while she was still president of the Dunedin Central and the Otago District Unions.

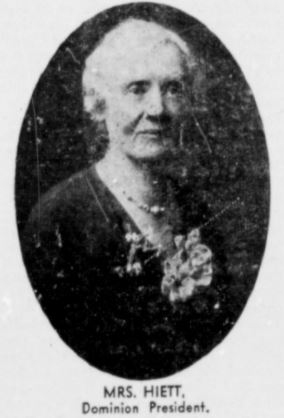
Jessie Ann McKenzie Hiett c1943

She served in this role for eight years, including Acting President during Taylor's illness at the Invercargill Convention of 1933. Taylor, growing too ill, stepped down. At the 1935 national convention in Dunedin, with 78 delegates representing 81 dues-paying Unions, Hiett was elected president.

Meanwhile, her husband grew incapacitated and after fourteen months of illness, died 11 July 1935. Besides his role as a singer in the Hanover Street Baptist Sunday School, William Henry Hiett had been an active supporter of the temperance movement, leading children's groups called Bands of Hope.

Much of Hiett's WCTU NZ work through the 1930s focused on gathering statistics on alcoholism as a cause for crime and death and about the victims from the trade in alcohol. As the war in Europe and the Pacific theatres heated up, she advocated for total abstinence since the liquor industry encouraged waste and used the grain needed for starving people and animals. On 13 November 1940, the Hanover Street Baptist Church in Dunedin honored Hiett for her 25th year of service as deaconess, and they presented her with a "fireside chair."

The national WCTU NZ convention of 1942 was postponed "because of the Pacific menace," and only the Executive Council met in Christchurch that year. Her presidential address at the 1943 convention at Palmerston North focused on WCTU NZ goals for international peace, prohibition, and ending the inequities in the way government addressed the problem of venereal diseases as well as the promotion of gambling, including the lottery used for patriotic purposes. An eye operation in 1944 put Hiett in the hospital for a month, and they decided not to have a convention that year due to the restrictions on travel.

In 1945 at the WCTU NZ convention at Dunedin the debates over the Union's stance on conscientious objectors showed the conservative turn most delegates were beginning to evidence. However, Hiett continued to push for closing saloons when all wished to celebrate the end of World War II, e.g., Victory in Europe Day.

Hiett participated in a mass meeting in Octagon Hall on 23 September 1945 together with the [New Zealand Alliance https://teara.govt.nz/en/1966/prohibition/page-3] Dunedin Branch. They set up a group to tour hotels on Fridays 7:30 - 9 p.m. to evidence after-hour trading, and received attacks by the press.

On 28 December 1945, her youngest sister, Robina Lily McKenzie, died. The WCTU NZ leadership offered their sympathies, and Hiett mentioned how grateful she was for their support at the "passing of my beloved sister." In early 1946, their brother Donald McKenzie, a boat builder who also lived together with them at 11 Duke Street in Dunedin grew ill. He was 75 years old when he died on 24 March 1946. Hiett had already announced her retirement from the role of WCTU NZ president. A description of her leadership skills was published in The White Ribbon:

Her natural dignity and presence are such as to inspire the utmost respect and confidence. Tact and gentleness combined with firm handling of difficult situations, which are not always avoidable, have characterised her chairmanship. Her deep spirituality has pervaded the atmostphere and has been a very profound influence at each Convention, and we all owe her sincere thanks for this.

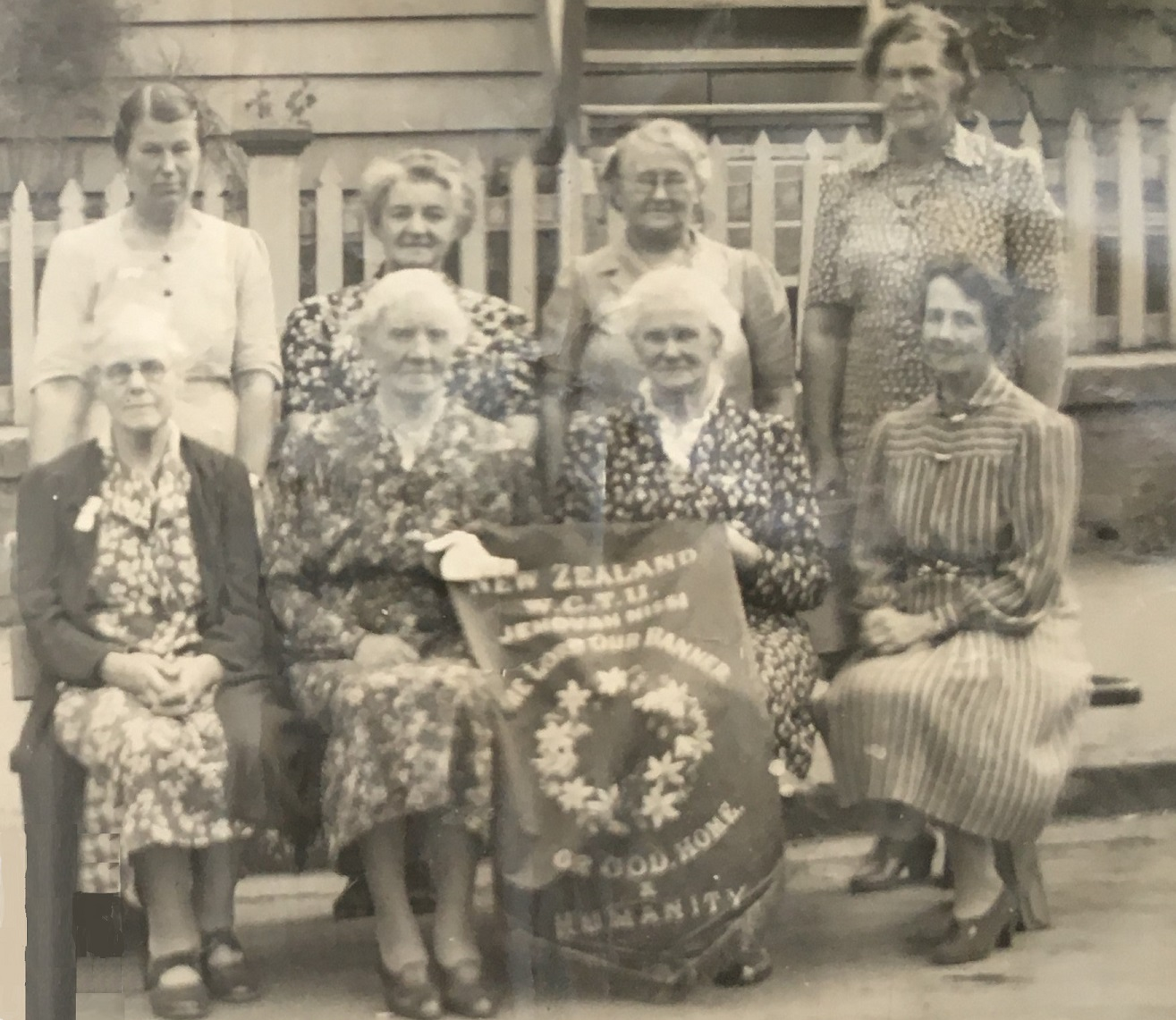
WCTU NZ officers 1946:back (l-r) Janet Atkinson, Mary Wharton Christian, Annie Doris Grigg, Mrs. V. Underhill; front (l-r) M.B. "Lucy" Lovell-Smith, Jessie Hiett, Cybele Ethyl Kirk, Constance Toomer

Hiett served as Dominion Vice President under Cybele Ethyl Kirk of Wellington from 1946 to 1949. She retired when Kirk did in 1949, and Catherine M. McLay was elected the new WCTU NZ president. Hiett's address given during 1947 Convention evidenced her assuredness in her new status: "The Women's Christian Temperance Union is opposed to the Liquor Traffic because it is non-Christian, it is contrary to all that makes for a Christian nation. ... we must take up arms against this enemy of Christ. We are living not only for the present, we are living for the future. Every little life is our concern; therefore we oppose the liquor traffic for what it does to children."

== Writings about WCTU NZ and leaders ==
- "Memorial Service to the Late Mrs. T.E. Taylor" (1941)
- "In Memoriam, Mrs. Kate Downing, Dunedin Central Union" (1946)
- "A Tribute to Mrs. Peryman" (1947)
- "The Women's Christian Temperance Union" (1948)
- "Memorial Day, Rachel Don" (1951)
- "A Tribute, Miss G.A. Drew, M.A., J.P." (1952)
- "Franchise Day, Lest we Forget" (1952)
- "Memorial Day, Great Women of the W.C.T.U." (1955)
- "Miss C.E. Kirk, J.P., A Temperance Stalwart Passes" (1957)

== Death ==
Hiett returned to serve as the Dunedin District Union Vice President in 1947 and continued in this capacity until 1960. She was honored for her service by the Dunedin Central Union in December 1954. They gave her a table lamp and an electric heating pad, however her thank-you speech emphasised the future of the WCTU NZ and how they must fight on against alcohol. "Let us use the Press more often than in the past. Write on the gambling menace and on Temperance. Let us endeavour to do more through Sunday Schools. Let us always be courteous. What may we do in regard to Liquor advertising?" Her last public presentation was in July 1959 at a meeting of South Dunedin at which she spoke on the WCTU NZ struggle to gain the right to vote.

Jessie died in Dunedin on 14 September 1962. She is buried in Andersons Bay Cemetery in the same plot with her older brother, Donald McKenzie.

== See also ==
- Alcohol in New Zealand
- Temperance movement in New Zealand
- Women's Christian Temperance Union New Zealand
