= Hera Stirling =

New Zealand temperance activist (1876–1950)

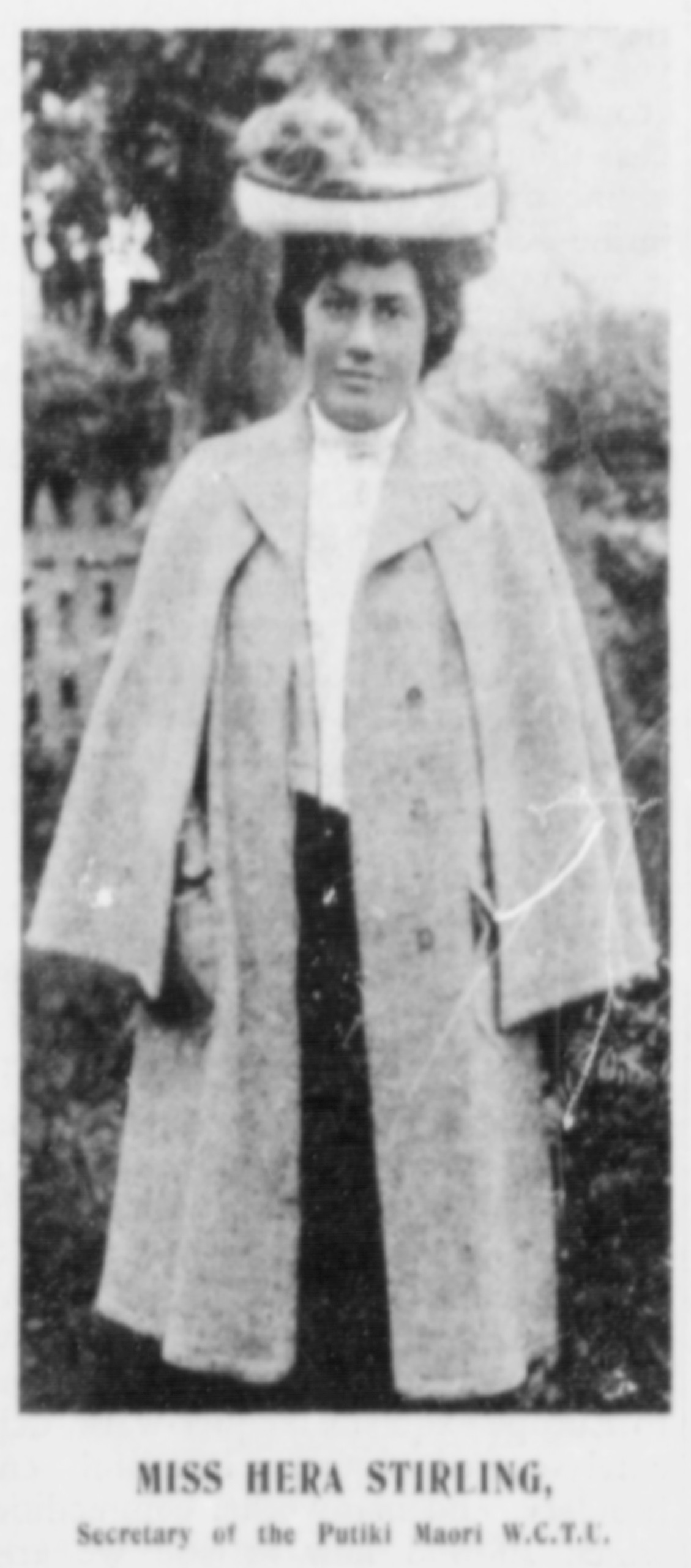
- Stirling in 1906
- Born: Sarah Mary Catherine Stirling; 1876; Riverton, New Zealand
- Died: 3 August 1950 (aged 74); Rotorua, New Zealand
- Other names: Hera Manaro
- Known for: humanitarian works, temperance activism
- Spouse: Himiperi Munro (m. 1910)

Sarah Mary Catherine Stirling (1876 – 3 August 1950), known as Hera Stirling and, after her marriage, as Hera Munro, was a New Zealand Māori activist, suffragist, and missionary of Ngāi Tahu descent.

== Early life ==
Born as Sarah Mary Catherine Stirling in 1876 in Riverton, Southland, she became an evangelist in the Salvation Army and trained as an officer in Wellington. She went with a troop of Salvation Army singers to Australia in 1895 and returned two more times. She married Himeperi "Humphrey" Te Wharekauri Munro, an Anglican minister at Pakipaki, in the Napier Cathedral on 2 November 1910. She thereafter used his surname. They were the parents of Capt. Pango Stirling Munro, 2nd Maori Battalion of the New Zealand Infantry.

== Temperance leadership ==
At the start of the twentieth century, Stirling worked with many different Māori iwis to establish local chapters of the Women's Christian Temperance Union New Zealand (WCTU NZ) in Wanganui, New Zealand. In March 1905 she formed the Pūtiki Maori Christian Temperance Union with Mrs. R. Davis (daughter of Taitoko Keepa Te Rangihiwinui, Major Kemp) elected president, Hena Stirling as secretary, Mark Peneaha as treasurer, and Matthew Patopu assistant secretary. She continued to sing evangelist songs to public audiences, for example at the WCTU NZ convention in 1905 at Wanganui.

With the support of WCTU NZ presidents Lily Atkinson and Fanny Cole, Stirling served as a national organizer of the Māori chapters of the WCTU NZ whilst teaching bible classes and working as a secretary for the Pūtiki WCTU NZ. Stirling founded in 1908 a branch at Tuahiwi, north of Kaiapoi (a photo of the gathering of Māori and Pākehā women is archived in the Canterbury Museum, Bishop Collection); and, in 1910 she organised a branch in Te Hauke, south of Hastings. In 1911, she organised the first national convention for the Māori unions of the WCTU NZ; it was held just outside of Hastings in the town of Pakipaki, where each of the Māori branches gathered. At this convention, the delegates of the seven unions present formed a Union District, with Stirling elected as president and Matehaere Ripeka Brown Halbert as Vice President.

In 1922, Stirling became the first woman elected to a synod in the Anglican Diocese of Waiapu.

== Death ==
No longer an official organiser of the WCTU NZ, Stirling continued to serve as a missionary for the Anglican Church, visiting the sick and elderly, teaching Bible classes and assisting her husband in Ohinemutu with Sunday School services. She founded and led a youth branch of the local WCTU NZ chapter in 1936. She died on 3 August 1950 at the age of 74, and on August 12, after laying in state at the Anglican St. Faith Parish and a tangi, her body was placed in a burial vault in Rotorua.
