= Rachel Don =

Prominent member of temperance and women's rights movement in New Zealand

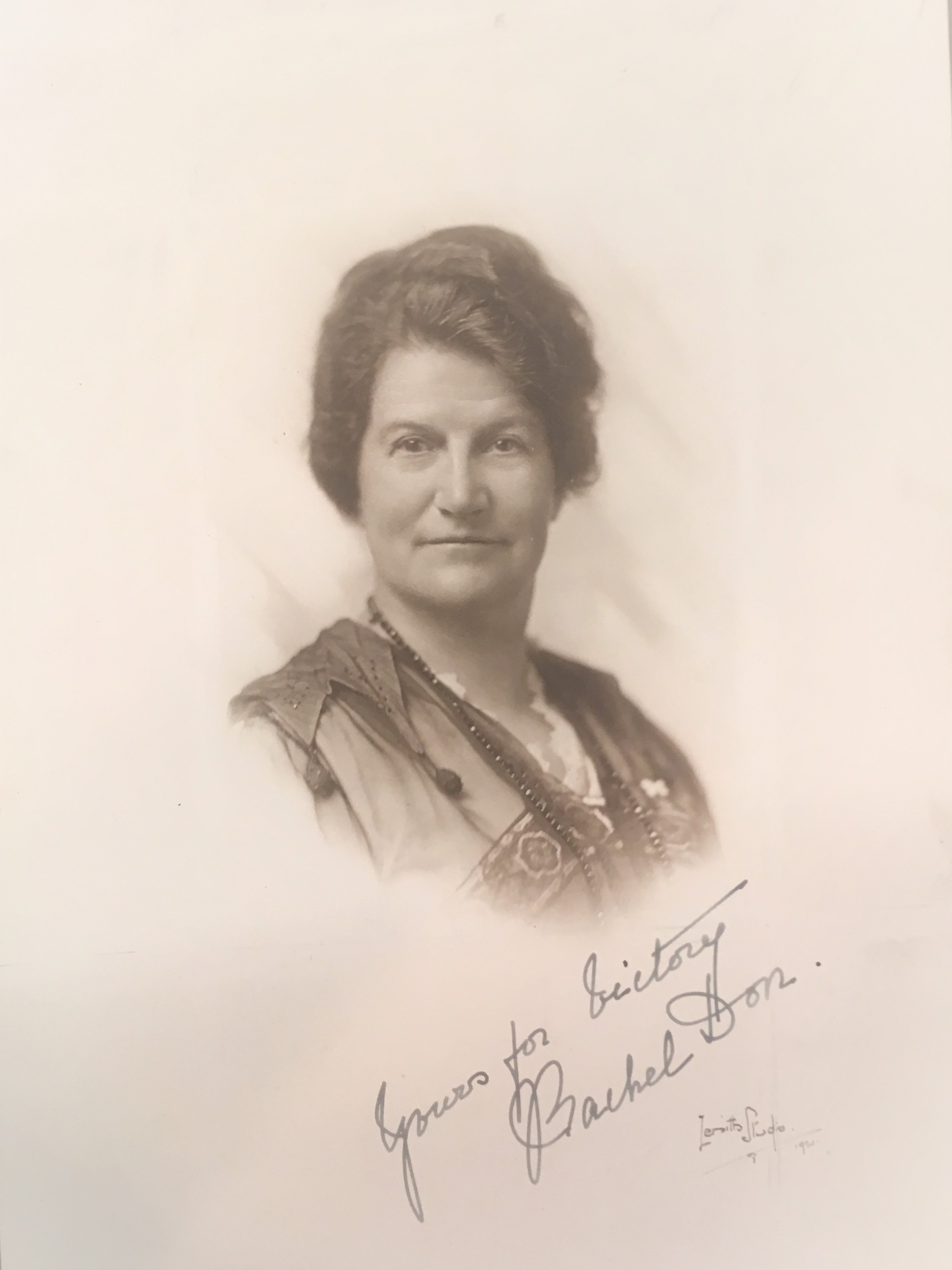
- Yours for Victory, Rachel Don [circa 1924]
- Born: Rachel Hull; 23 July 1866; Hokitika, New Zealand
- Died: 4 September 1941 (aged 75); Dunedin
- Known for: accredited Methodist local preacher, humanitarian works, temperance activism, president of Women's Christian Temperance Union New Zealand
- Spouse: William Rae Don (m. 25 October 1890)

Rachel Don (née Hull; 23 July 1866 – 4 September 1941) was an accredited Methodist local preacher who became a local and national leader in the Women's Christian Temperance Union New Zealand (WCTU NZ), serving as president from 1914 to 1926. Under her leadership, the WCTU NZ focused on white slavery, promoting national prohibition, and expanding women's career opportunities, especially in the New Zealand Police Force and judicial system. She represented New Zealand at a world-wide temperance convention in London in 1920, and at the U.S. Woman's Christian Temperance Union Jubilee in 1924. She served in many other local charitable organisations, and after visiting India, became a fervent leader of the Dominion Stocking League to send refurbished clothing for impoverished children and women to Christian mission stations in India.

== Early life ==
Rachel Hull Don was born at Hokitika, New Zealand, on 23 July 1866. She was the daughter of Mary Ann Walters and James Washington Hull. Not much is known about her father except that he was an American. By 1880, according to the New Zealand Wise's Directory, her mother was living alone with her children on Aldred Street (now Beveridge Street) in central Christchurch. Rachel Hull had at least one sibling. Her older brother James Washington Hull was an iron and brass moulder who married Minnie Cockle (1867–1950) in 1889. Rachel Hull attended the Christchurch Normal School and studied to become one of the first women in New Zealand to become certified Methodist local preacher. Because the records of the Local Preachers' Association in New Zealand were destroyed by fire in the 1950s, her claim in 1925 of being the first woman Methodist local preacher cannot be documented. She also worked as an evangelist for the Salvation Army.

In the Durham Street Wesleyan Church in Christchurch on 17 October 1890, Rachel Hull married William Rae Don, a stationer on Broughton Street in South Dunedin. Rachel Don began getting involved in civic and church activities. She signed both the 1892 and 1893 women's suffrage petitions with her address as Dunedin.

== Temperance and charity work ==
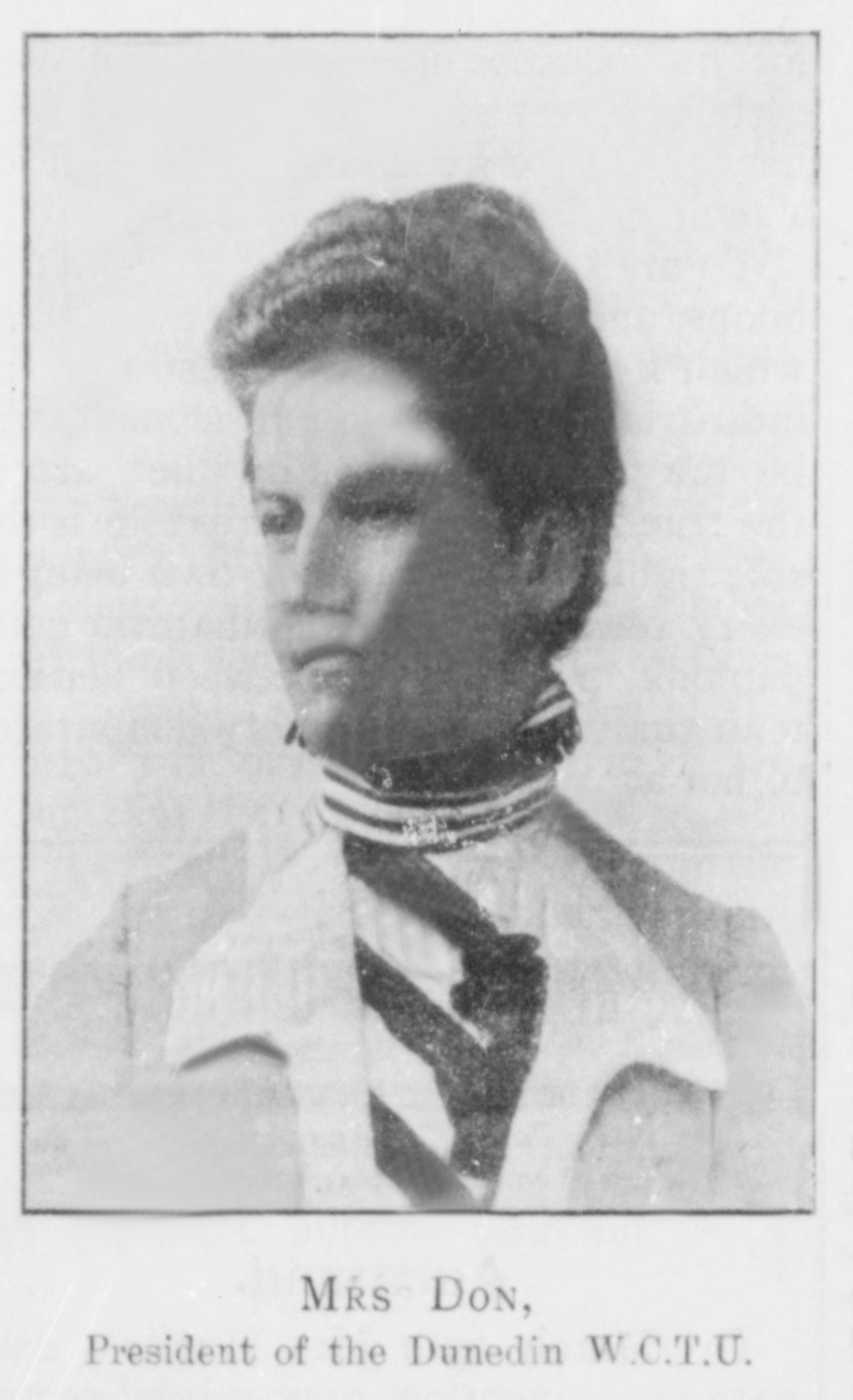

In the 1890s, Rachel Don got involved with the Dunedin Methodist Central Mission and became a popular speaker for temperance meetings, eventually being appointed as Dunedin WCTU NZ superintendent for Evangelistic work department. She also served briefly as secretary for the local Union in 1898, before she was elected president in 1901. Don regularly collaborated in teas and gospel meetings for sailors at the Dunedin Sailors' Rest.

In the meantime, she was also a member of the Ladies' Auxiliary of the YMCA Dunedin; an executive member of the Otago Sunday School Union; a superintendent of the Methodist Central Mission Sunday School, Dunedin; an official visitor for the Dunedin Hospital; and the Ladies Cooperative Committee for the Charitable Aid Board.

== Leadership in Women's Christian Temperance Union of New Zealand ==
Though she was president of the Dunedin Union for only two years (1901 and 1902), Don was appointed as acting national president of the Women's Christian Temperance Union New Zealand (WCTU NZ) in 1904 by Lily Atkinson who took time off to have her baby. She returned in 1906 to serving as president of the Dunedin Union until 1909. That year, she was still busy in WCTU NZ work, however. Her speech during the Frances Willard Commemoration on April 20 in Dunedin followed a procession and tableaux of women representing twelve nations in the World WCTU. She accompanied the WCTU NZ president Fanny Cole as part of a deputation calling on the Minister for Education to advocate for the formal addition of scientific temperance instruction in public school curriculum. She argued that the curriculum currently included how to care for eyes and teeth but had not included the "most important element, the brain." She insisted that the science behind how alcohol destroyed the nerve tissues of the brain needed to be included in the health curriculum. "We represent organised mother's love, and for the sake of our children we feel that the day is gone when we ask – we demand from a democratic Government that this measure shall be introduced as soon as possible."

Don took on various leadership roles in the local Union before and during World War I, serving as vice-president and president of the Dunedin Young Women's Christian Temperance Union, who worked to recruit young women to the cause with demonstrations and parades as well as lunch hour meetings in the factories. Don also served as press superintendent, and she stepped in as vice-president or acting president when needed. In 1912 at the 27th WCTU NZ convention in Dunedin, Don was nominated by Fanny Cole as vice-president-at-large. She served in this national role for two years.

In March 1913, Don was not able to attend the WCTU NZ convention in Nelson due to the illness and death of her mother in Christchurch. And when Fanny Cole died in May 1913, Don stepped forward as acting president for the rest of that year. Her memorial for Cole was published in The White Ribbon, and in it she showed her political acumen during a difficult time of disagreement among the WCTU NZ members. The Nelson convention under the leadership of Fanny Cole had served as a springboard for debate over whether or not the Union would collaborate in campaigns by the Bible in Schools League, but the majority voted no. Don counseled compromise and loyalty to the WCTU NZ as a democratic decision-making body: "my first act will be to appeal in her (Cole's) sacred memory to the Unions throughout the Dominion to cease all strife over the Bible in Schools question. ... The Union stands, as it has always stood, for the Bible in schools, only we differ as to the method of teaching it. In memory of the departed one, let us agree to differ, and instead of wasting time in argument, let us be loyal to our Union..." There must still have been controversy over this topic since she had to send a stern reminder in May of the need for compromise.

At the March 1914 convention in Gisborne Don was elected President of WCTU NZ. Her President's address included many of the twentieth century goals of the WCTU NZ such as food reform, training hostels for girls, oversight of immoral content in films and magazines, Sabbath observance, anti-gambling, prohibitionism, and support for disabled women in maternity homes, asylums and gaols. Her own sense of how the WCTU NZ supported the progress of the nation was described in a section of her address in which she described the importance women in establishing a good home through "mother love:"

The home is the unit and the base of the city. What the home is, that will be the city and the State. The home is the real school of the nation. What is taught there will be practised in the larger life. .. What is needed is the restoration of parental authority, an authority which has at its goal, not the exercise of superior power, but the application of restraint, control, and direction over the life of the child.

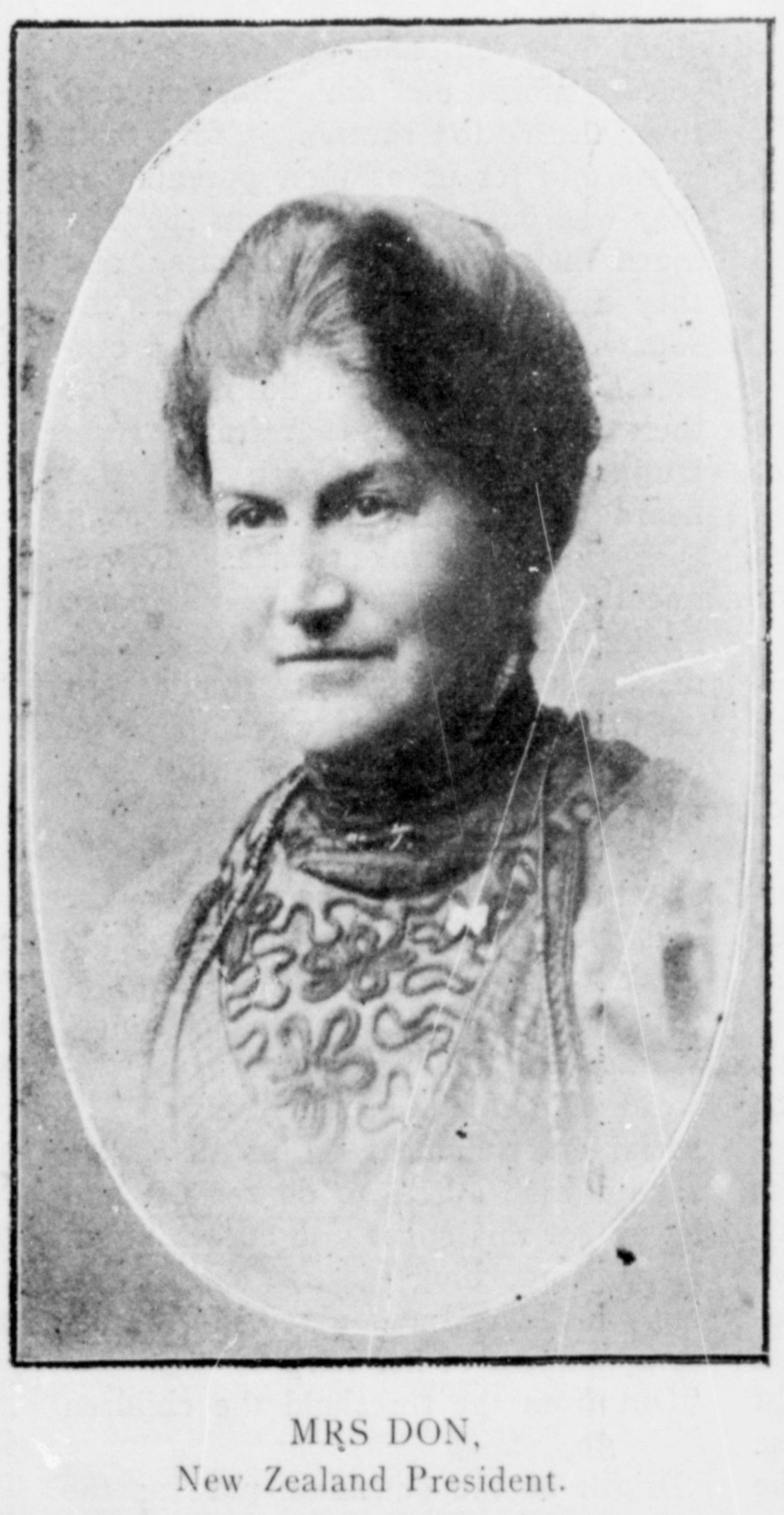

Don's life-long battle to convince Parliament to pass a national law prohibiting the production and sale of alcohol began in earnest in 1914. She was part of a deputation of prohibitionists who visited the Prime Minister on 26 June 1914, seeking to revise the Licensing Act so that a simple majority would allow for a community to vote against the trade in alcohol. She assured her listeners that no one knew more about "this evil" than she did. "I have visited the gaols since I was a girl of seventeen. I have come in contact with the victims of this evil; and of all the sufferers by the trade. It is the women and children that suffer the most."

That year Parliament replaced the three-fifths majority required to win a national referendum on prohibition with a fifty percent majority. To the WCTU NZ members, Don sent an open letter encouraging them to support their country in a time of war but to not slack on WCTU NZ temperance work. She wrote: "The wave of patriotism sweeping through the Dominion, the dreadful news from the battlefield, our anxiety for our own Empire, our interest in our boys, is no reason why we should slacken our work. There is no better way we could help in the defence of our country than by the overthrow of the Traffic, which is always more deadly in its effect than war."

=== Policewomen ===
As part of the fight for women's rights, Don together with Kate Edger Evans, Anna Stout and leaders of other women's groups pushed for the appointment of women police. Though New Zealand had already seen the appointments of police matrons in some cities since the late 1890s (with limited duties), the New Zealand Police Force did not include women as officers as was already happening in the U.S. and other countries. Similar to the compromises for women's enfranchisement in 1893, the women leaders argued that the role of police women in New Zealand would be limited. Don proposed that the appointment of women police would "have nothing to do with the arrest of intoxicated men" who might physically overwhelm them, but instead would "instruct girls on sex questions," meet trains to help girls travelling on their own or deal with their housing problems, so to "try to prevent crime and help make good citizens." After an interview with a recalcitrant Minister of Justice in October 1916, a group of reformers published their protests in the Dunedin Evening Star. Don's contribution insisted that the new policewoman would be someone "specially qualified" for the job. That they would be hired for their qualities of being "tactful, discreet, silent women, of high moral and religious character, having a great love for those who are under temptation." In other words, someone with a missionary background—she called them "vigilance women," who would see it as "their duty to 'mother' those who they see are in need of help, and take steps to guard them from those who would lead them astray." However, the best the government would do would come in 1917 with the creation of Health Patrols in the Social Hygiene Act of 1917 as part of the continued fight against the spread of venereal diseases. The New Zealand Police Force Act was not amended until 1938 to allow for the appointment of policewomen, and it was not until 1941 that women were actually hired.

=== Influence of U.S. prohibitionism ===
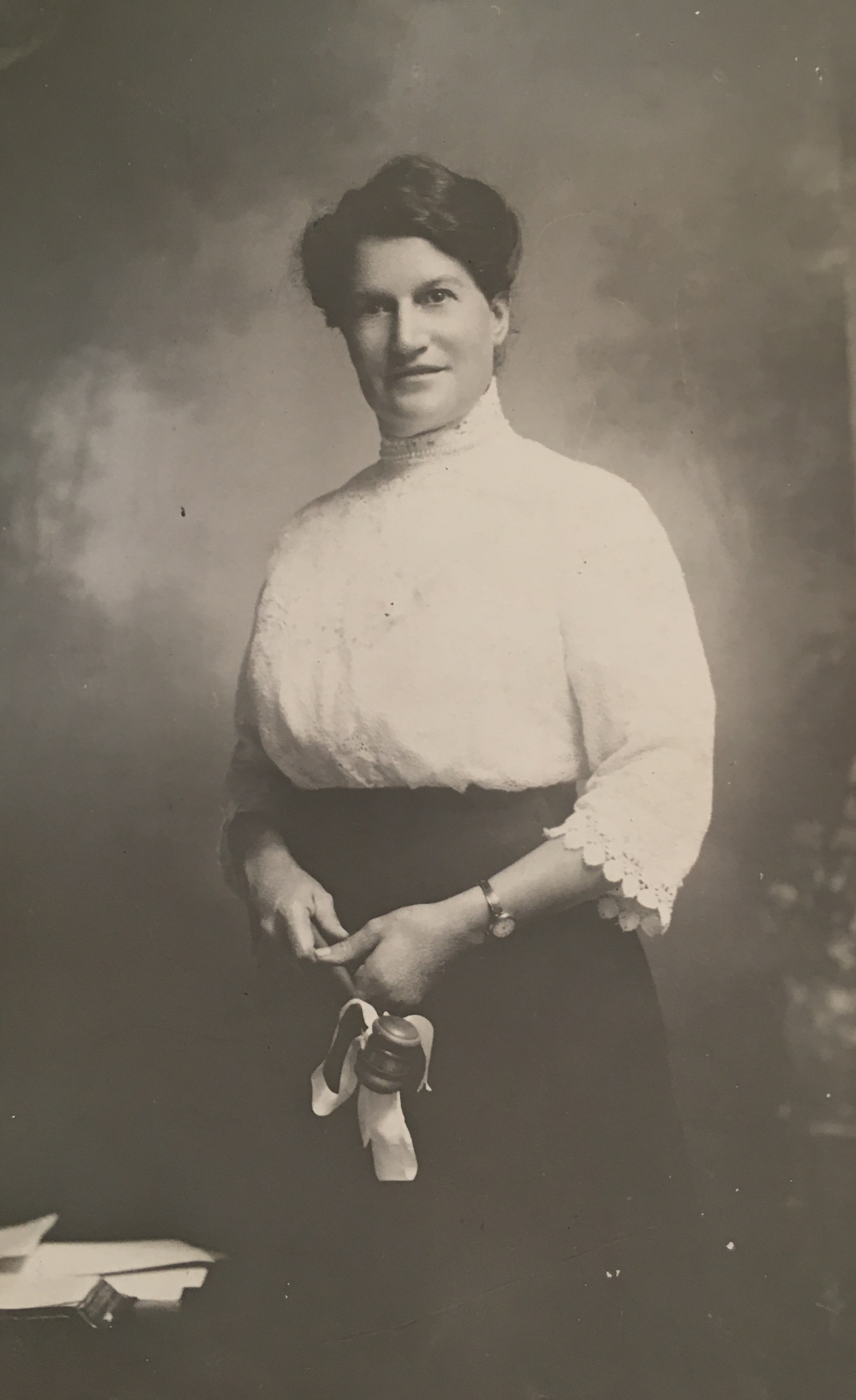
Rachel Hull Don, president of WCTU NZ, with gavel presented by Kansas prohibitionists 1918

In 1918 Rachel Don received a gift from William Franklin Horn (1870–1956), a local historian and genealogist from Topeka, Kansas. It contained a gavel made from a billiard ball and a brevet-handle by a saloon-keeper who closed his business after being convinced to do so by Susan St. John, the governor's wife. The gavel had, Horn wrote, been used by Kansas Governor John St John when in 1881 he successfully led to fruition the prohibition amendment to the state's constitution. The national prohibition movement in the U.S. was galvanised with campaigns by the Anti-Saloon League and the Woman's Christian Temperance Union. The Eighteenth Amendment to the United States Constitution, banning the manufacture, transportation and sale of alcohol, was ratified by the requisite number of states on 16 January 1919 and soon thereafter the Volstead Act to enforce it. Rachel Don wrote an open letter to "all good women everywhere to join with us heart and soul in the holy endeavour to protect and sanctify thehome by outlawing the traffic in alcoholic liquors." That year, in New Zealand, two national polls to create a prohibition law lost by very small margins.

==== 1920 World Conventions in London ====
In February, Rachel Don wrote to the WCTU NZ chapters from New Brighton, Christchurch where she had been undergoing hydrotherapy in the hot sea water baths. She wrote about the upcoming trip to London with Bessie Lee Cowie as delegates to the World Woman's Christian Temperance Union convention in April. She and Cowie wrote of their sea voyage from New Zealand through Panama and Kingston, Jamaica to Newport News, Virginia where they toured the countryside before sailing on to London. There were over four hundred delegates at the World WCTU Convention, representing over forty countries. Don spoke on the New Zealand campaign for national prohibition, including the strategy in 1919 of "snowballing" the House and Ministers by every White Ribboner posting a letter or sending messages. She had been accompanied also by her husband W.R. Don who had attended the convention of the World League Against Alcoholism organised by the U.S. Anti Saloon League. Don fell ill again during her stay in London and was not able then to make her formal visits to temperance-related organisations and leaders as she had hoped.

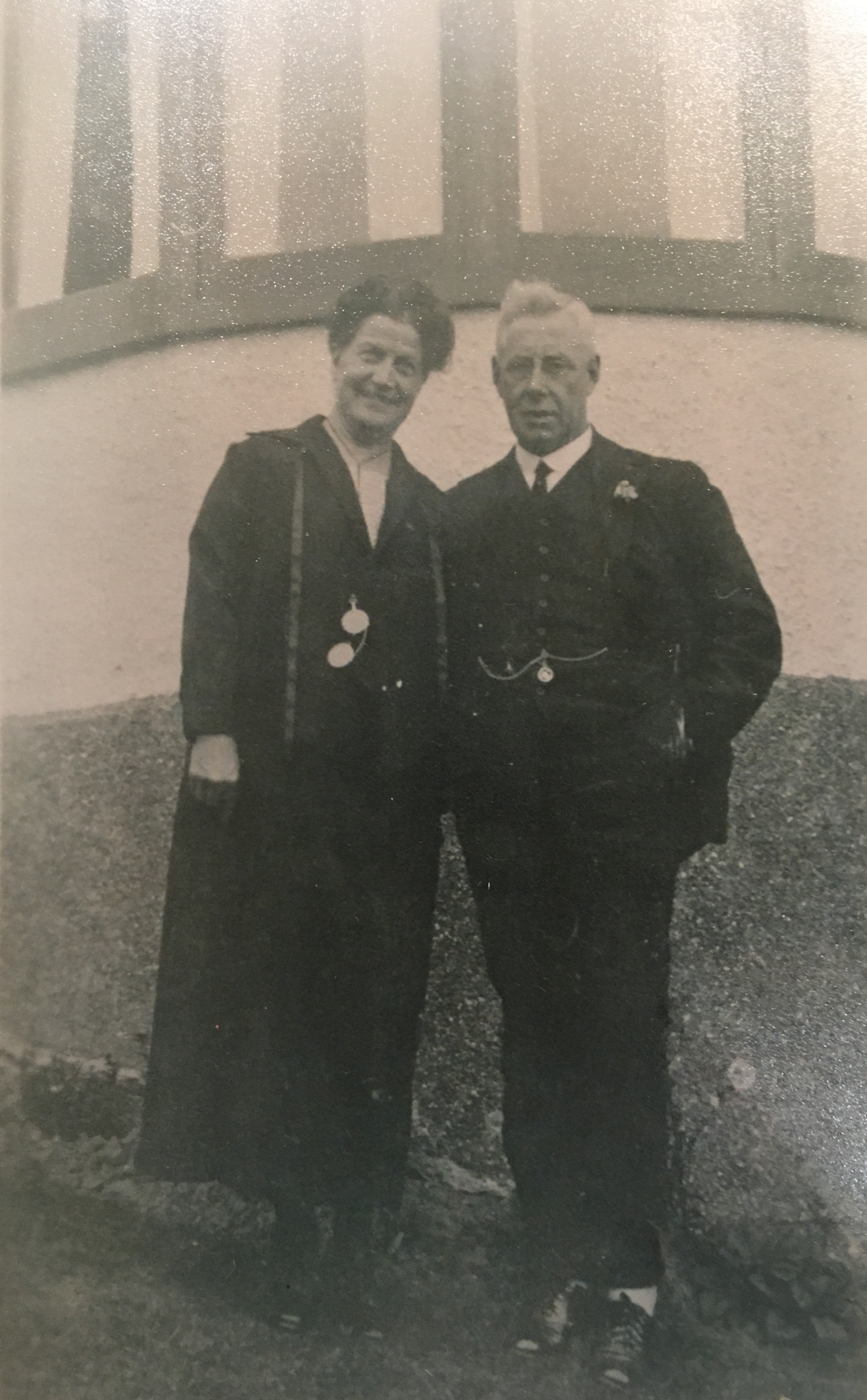
Rachel Hull Don and husband William Rae Don

== Post 1920 leadership ==
The 36th WCTU NZ Convention held at Ashburton in March 1921 celebrated the decision by government to have scientific temperance instruction taught in public schools. In her presidential address, Don urged the delegates to support teachers in this effort as "they are protecting our children when they show them the evils which lurk in alcohol." Similarly, she praised the decision of the Minister of Internal Affairs, the Hon. George James Anderson, to halt the showing of "any moving pictures which have a lowering tendency on the moral life of our young people." She continued in her address with a long list of those countries that had been successful in prohibition laws, and urged the delegates to continue with their work toward the next poll in New Zealand. That year Don made sure all the local unions protested against the proposed Social Hygiene Bill with its emphasis on compulsory notification and examination of women. She insisted that this was a step backwards in protecting women's rights since "it exposes any woman to malicious denunciation by men of bad character." She reminded them to advocate for the State to provide "free, secret, efficient treatment for all patients suffering from venereal disease."

In 1922 the 37th national WCTU NZ convention was held at Hamilton in March with a strong showing from the local Unions. The WCTU NZ now had over 5000 paying members, nearly 500 in the Youth branches, and they celebrated the success of two large Māori Unions' meetings that had occurred that year at Batley (in Kaipara District) and Wanganui. In her president's address that year, she continued to push for national prohibition: "We must pray for success, exercise our faith for success, go to sleep dreaming of it, and wake up planning for it. – Live success, act success. Remember our slogan, 'New Zealand Dry in 1922.' And continually create success."

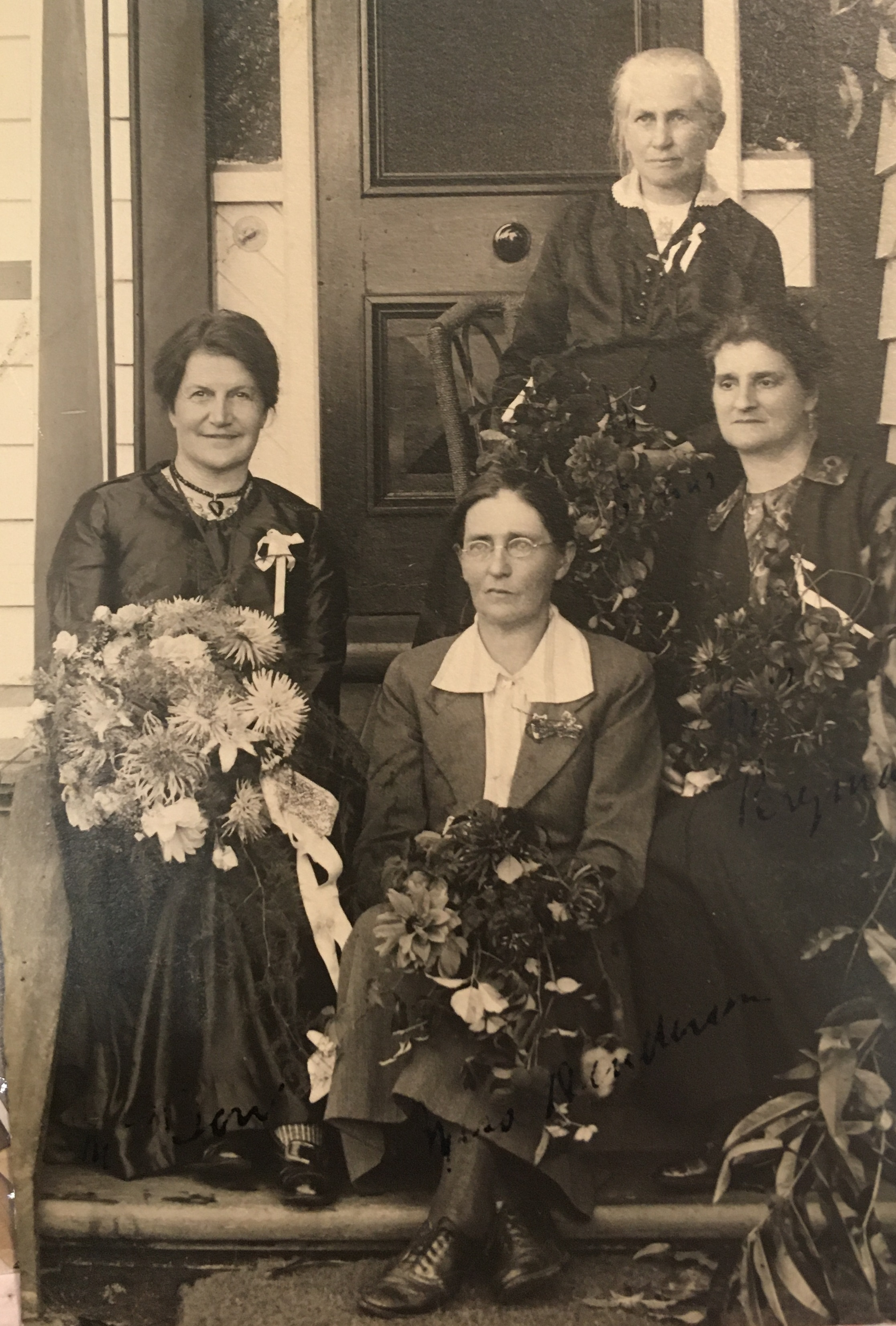
WCTU NZ national officers: Rachel Don, Christina Henderson, Kate Evans, Nellie Peryman

On the last day of the meeting, the Māori delegates sang a hymn then gave a farewell gift to Don, a greenstone tiki that she wore on a ribbon around her neck. The gift was documented in a group photograph of the national officers who had finished their 1921 year of service: Rachel Don, president; Christina Henderson of Christchurch, corresponding secretary; Kate Edger Evans of Wellington, recording secretary, Nellie Peryman of Carterton, editor of White Ribbon). Missing from the photograph were Priscilla Crabb of Palmerston North, acting president and vice-president; N.F. Walker of Gisborne, Maori Organising Treasurer; and, Alice Earnshaw of Christchurch, Organiser.

At both the 38th and the 39th WCTU NZ conventions Don emphasised the role of the Union in pushing a national prohibition campaign. Her presidential address at New Plymouth in March 1924 was filled with the passionate rhetoric that commanded the attention of her delegates and the public:

We are engaged in a holy crusade and are in this fight not because we do not like alcohol, not because we wish to remove any legitimate pleasure from the life of our people not because we desire to sit in judgment on those who differ from us, but because we honestly and sincerely believe that alcoholism has been brought to the bar of human judgment and stands condemned in the fact that it militates against the welfare of society, the integrity of the home, and the highest realisation of human personality. Husbands should go through life in a spirit of love, fidelity and harmony; alcohol puts into them the demon of dissension and jealousy. They should provide the necessary support for the family by regular, honest work; alcohol uses up a large part of their earnings needed for supplying actual wants. Alcohol causes hundreds of thousands of children to lead a miserable existence, with weak bodies in unhealthy homes. Alcohol destroys in the hearts of many fathers love for their own children; it destroys in so many pitiable children honour and respect for their parents... Go forth as ambassadors, as the mouthpieces of those who are in the grip and bondage of drink, and long for freedom! Go forth in the great war of liberation. Sisters, go forth against the enemy of the home, the State, the race, yea, of God Himself, and in His name fight against alcohol until its kingdom is shattered and its slaves liberated.

In April 1924 Don and Christina Henderson left from Wellington to sail to the U.S. and attend the Woman's Christian Temperance Union Jubilee convention. They toured the various women's clubs and temperance social reform spots in San Francisco and Los Angeles for a month and then travelled inland by train. They wrote letters back to the readers of the White Ribbon with great detail of their visits state and local leaders of the WCTU and other women's clubs in Salt Lake City, Denver, Omaha, Des Moines and Iowa City. They reached Evanston, Illinois in July where they met with U.S. WCTU president Anna Adams Gordon. From there, they took some time off to visit Dr. Mary Harris Armor at her home in Eastman, Georgia – Dr. Armor had toured New Zealand in 1922 to help with the WCTU NZ prohibition campaign. Henderson went on to England while Don attended three state WCTU Jubilee conventions, writing back to New Zealand of the decorations and food served at the banquets. While she was in Washington D.C. she spoke briefly with U.S. President Calvin Coolidge about women's activism in New Zealand. She finally sailed from New York in late December to spend two weeks in London for the World WCTU Jubilee Convention and touring the temperance sites she had not been able to see in her 1920 visit. From there she travelled to Aden, Mumbai (then called Bombay) and from there inland to the Pandita Ramabai Mukti Mission, a farm in the Pune district of India. A refuge for women, child widows and outcast children, the Mukti Mission had for many years been supported by the WCTU, and New Zealand women had been contributing to it from its beginning in 1889. She got home to New Zealand in time to speak at the national WCTU NZ Convention in Dunedin in March 1925.

Don spent the next six months touring New Zealand and giving speeches, giving talks almost daily. She spoke about her experiences on her world tour, expounding on the benefits of prohibition in the U.S., and met with members of Parliament to try and advocate for total prohibition in New Zealand. In November 1925 she announced that she had spoken personally with WCTU NZ leaders across the country to tell them that she had decided not to stand again for national president. At the national convention, she stepped aside to allow the delegates to vote for Elizabeth Best Taylor of Christchurch who had been vice-president and was acting president of the WCTU NZ in Don's absence. Don remained however as national superintendent of the Evangelistic Work department.

== Dominion Stocking League ==
Living in her new home at 5 Bellevue Street in Roslyn, Dunedin, Don took up management of the Dominion Stocking League. From donations of discarded stocking legs sent to her from around the country, volunteers created "princess petticoats, onepiece frocks, rompers and jumpers, knickers and bed jackets, hats, jelly bag shape), turbans, dainty silk bonnets, cuffs, mittens, scarves, sleeveless vests for old ladies, and all sizes patch work quilts, made of pieces of sox and stockings joined in a flat seam, with brilliant coloured braids stitched lattice pattern over it." The resulting garments were then distributed to WCTU-supported mission stations in India, including the Ramabai Mukti mission. She provided annual reports of the number of garments produced from the donated stockings and undergarments, sometimes as many as 500.

== Illness and death ==
In 1933, Don was very ill and in the hospital for two months. Her speaking engagements had lessened though she continued to participate in the WCTU NZ district and local clubs. She continued to write an annual report to the White Ribbon thanking all who sent "stockings and woollies" for the Indian women and children at the various missions.

On 4 September 1941, Rachel Hull Don died after a long illness. Jessie Hiett, WCTU NZ president, was with her on that last day. Don was buried at Dunedin Northern Cemetery.

== Writings ==
- "Final Appeal. To the Electors of Dunedin Central. Who is Mr A. S. Adams. What has he done? "The Character of a City is determined by the Character of the men it honors." Poster published in 1905
- "White Slave Traffic: To the Men of New Zealand from the Women's Christian Temperance Union of New Zealand," leaflet published in 1914
- "The Question of Tobacco"
- "John Wesley"
- "Snaps of the World's Convention, 1920"

== See also ==
- Alcohol in New Zealand
- Temperance movement in New Zealand
