= Mary Harris Armor =

American and international temperance leader

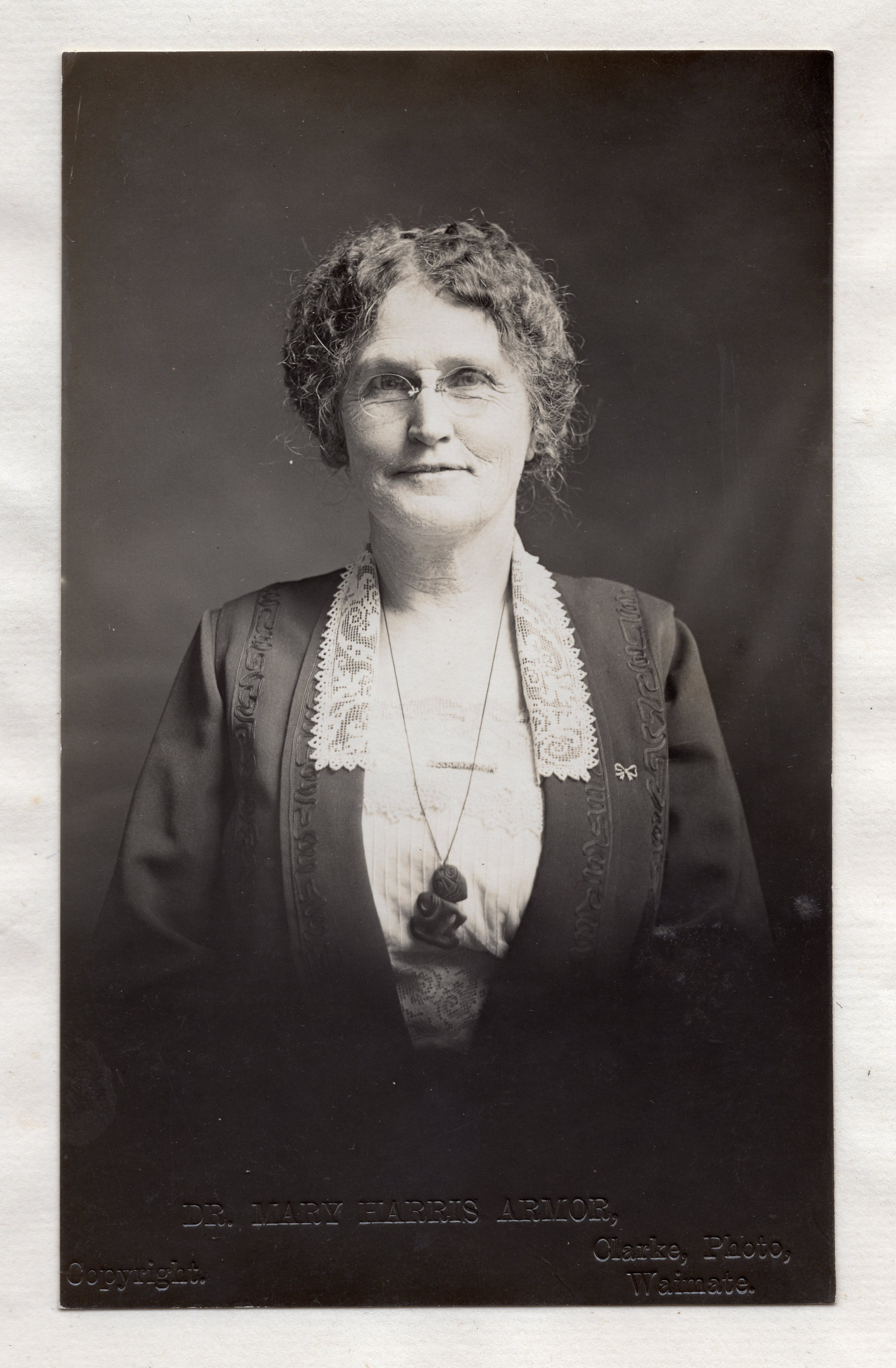
- Mary Harris Armor, c. 1922
- Born: March 9, 1863; Penfield, Georgia, C.S.
- Died: November 5, 1950 (aged 87); Fulton County, Georgia, U.S.
- Known for: Georgia State President of the Woman's Christian Temperance Union
- Spouse: Walter Florence Armor (m. 1883)

Mary Elizabeth Harris Armor (sometimes spelled Armour; March 9, 1863 – November 6, 1950) was an American temperance leader. She was the Georgia state president of the Woman's Christian Temperance Union (WCTU) and is often credited for the passing of prohibition legislature in Georgia.

== Personal life ==
Mary Elizabeth Harris was born on March 9, 1863, in Georgia to physician William Harris. She married Walter Florence Armor in August 1883.

== Career ==
Armor often used the women's suffrage movement to advocate for prohibition in Georgia. Between 1903 and 1915, while serving in state and national offices with the WCTU, she lobbied for Congress to "protect women and children especially through prohibition legislation." As a result, Armor is often credited for the passing of prohibition legislation in Georgia. Upon the passing of a State-wide prohibition law in 1907, the newspaper Atlanta Constitution described her as the voice "that aroused the Christian conscience of the State and put it on the march." She predicted that "brewery stock in this country will not be worth as much as Confederate money was in 1865."

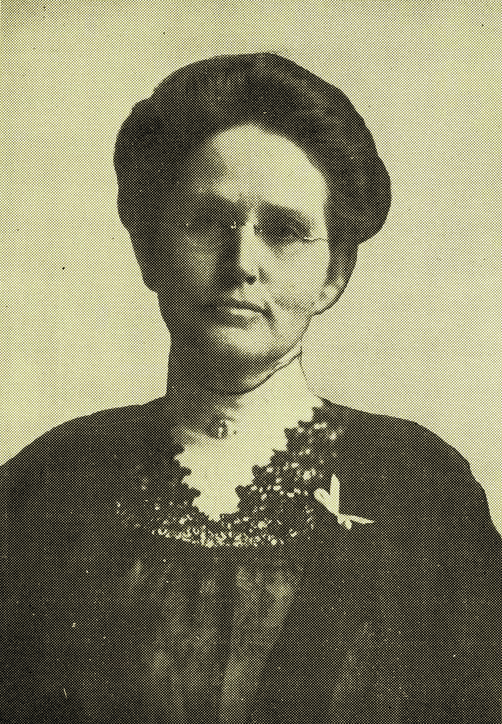
(1914)

Armor was often nicknamed the "Georgia Cyclone." She lectured and campaigned across the United States for the prohibition cause. Her speeches were so moving she was sometimes referred to as "the Joan of Arc of the temperance movement." In one instance, she raised $7,000 for WCTU in one night through an empowering speech. As a result of her campaigning, Armor was the recipient of an honorary law degree from Wesleyan College in 1918.

During the 1920s, she travelled to New Zealand to promote prohibition. The president of the Women's Christian Temperance Union New Zealand (WCTU NZ), Rachel Hull Don, organised a great welcome upon Dr. Armor's arrival in Wellington on 25 August 1922. Together with other clubs, the WCTU NZ organised parties and receptions as well as a formal introduction to the Prime Minister. She coined a slogan, sung to the popular tune of "Bringing in the Sheaves," that was sung by many New Zealanders as they campaigned for prohibition that year:

New Zealand's going dry!
New Zealand's going dry!
Pass along the watchword,
New Zealand’s going dry!
New Zealand’s going dry!
New Zealand's going dry!
Glory Hallelujah!
New Zealand’s going dry!

As part of her movement, Armor asked Fred Loring Seely of The Atlanta Georgian to allow the WCTU to publish in his newspapers. He refused as his newspaper was presenting the prohibition as an assertion of masculinity. Upon the passing of the Nineteenth Amendment to the United States Constitution, she joined the League of Women Voters.

Armor died on November 5, 1950.
