= David Tompkins =

New Zealand judge (1929–2023)

The Honourable Sir David Tompkins KNZM KC

5th Chancellor of the University of Waikato
- In office 1981–1985
- Preceded by: Doug Arcus
- Succeeded by: Henry Bennett

Judge of the High Court
- In office 1983–1997

Personal details
- Born: David Lance Tompkins; 26 July 1929 Hamilton, New Zealand
- Died: 1 July 2023 (aged 93)
- Spouse: Felicity Faris (m. 1956; died 2019)
- Children: 3
- Relatives: Lance Tompkins (father); Arthur Tompkins (son); Helen Crabb (great-aunt); Priscilla Crabb (great-grandmother)
- Education: Auckland University College
- Profession: Lawyer

Sir David Lance Tompkins KNZM KC (26 July 1929 – 1 July 2023) was a New Zealand lawyer and jurist. He served as a judge of the High Court of New Zealand from 1983 to 1997 and on the benches of the Courts of Appeal of Tonga and Fiji. He was chancellor of the University of Waikato between 1981 and 1985.

== Early life and family ==
Tompkins was born in Hamilton on 26 July 1929, the son of Arthur Lance Tompkins and Marjorie Rees Tompkins (née Manning). His maternal grandfather was Arthur Edwards Manning who served as mayor of Hamilton from 1912 to 1915, and his paternal great-aunt was the artist Helen Crabb. He was educated at Southwell School in Hamilton from 1939 to 1942, and King's College, Auckland from 1943 to 1946. He went on to study law at Auckland University College, graduating with a Bachelor of Laws degree in 1952.

In 1956, Tompkins married Erica Lya Felicity Faris, and the couple had three children, including Arthur Tompkins, who was appointed a district court judge in 1997.

== Career ==
Tompkins was a partner in the Hamilton legal firm of Tompkins Wake from 1953 to 1971 and continued practising as a barrister until 1983. He was appointed Queen's Counsel in 1974 and served as a judge of the Courts Martial Appeal Court between 1982 and 1983. In 1983, he was appointed to the bench of the High Court, serving as a judge until 1997, although he continued to serve after that as an acting judge. Between 1989 and 1992, he was executive judge of the High Court in Auckland, from 1995 he was a judge of the Court of Appeal of Tonga, and from 1997 a judge of the Court of Appeal of Fiji.

Tompkins was president of the Hamilton District Law Society between 1969 and 1971, and active in the New Zealand Law Society, serving as a council member from 1969 to 1971 and vice president from 1979 to 1981. He was also a LAWASIA council member between 1979 and 1981, and was chair of the Council of Legal Education from 1992 to 1998.

Outside of the legal sphere, Tompkins was president of Birthright Waikato in 1966, vice president then president of the Outward Bound Trust from 1981 to 1984, and chancellor of the University of Waikato from 1981 to 1985.

== Honours and awards ==
In 1977, Tompkins was awarded the Queen Elizabeth II Silver Jubilee Medal, and in 1990 he received the New Zealand 1990 Commemoration Medal. In the 1999 Queen's Birthday Honours, he was appointed a Knight Companion of the New Zealand Order of Merit, for services as a judge of the High Court and to the community.

In 1986, Tompkins was conferred with an honorary doctorate by the University of Waikato.

== Later life ==
Tompkins' wife, Felicity, Lady Tompkins, died in 2019.

Tompkins died on 1 July 2023, aged 93.
