= Tompkins Wake =

Law firm

- Headquarters: Hamilton
- No. of offices: 4
- No. of lawyers: 120+
- No. of employees: 210+
- Major practice areas: Full Service
- Key people: Tom Arieli (Chair), Jon Calder (CEO)
- Date founded: 1922
- Website: www.tompkinswake.com

Tompkins Wake is a New Zealand law firm, headquartered in Hamilton, New Zealand with offices also in Auckland, Rotorua and Tauranga. The firm was founded as Tompkins and Wake in Hamilton on 22 June 1922 by Lance Tompkins and Cecil Barry Wake (known as Barry Wake).

== History ==
Tompkins was a prominent lawyer in Hamilton. In 1958, he was appointed a Queen's Counsel. In 1963, he was called to the Supreme Court.

Sir David Tompkins (Lance Tompkins' son), studied from 1947 to 1952 and graduated from the then University of New Zealand with an LLB. He was also a partner in Tompkins Wake, was made a QC, and then sat as a High Court Judge in Auckland. Sir David was Chancellor of the University of Waikato from 1981 to 1985.

While the firm still bears its founders' names, it did become Tompkins, Wake, Paterson and Bathgate during the 1960s through to the 1980s when it returned to Tompkins Wake.

The firm famously launched the "Case for Hamilton" in 2009, threatening to sue the rest of New Zealand because it was difficult to recruit lawyers.

In November 2010 Tompkins Wake acquired Swarbrick Dixon to create Hamilton's largest law firm. The firm then opened its Auckland office in 2012 and in November 2014 Tompkins Wake merged with Davys Burton in Rotorua.

== Awards and recognition ==
=== 2016 ===
- New Zealand Law Awards Finalist – Mid Market Deal of the Year

=== 2017 ===
- Best Lawyers 2017 – Robert Bycroft, leading authority in Biotechnology Law
- New Zealand Law Awards Finalist – Mid Size Law Firm of the Year
- New Zealand Law Awards Finalist – Consumer, Media and Tech Deal of the Year

=== 2018 ===
- The Legal 500 Asia Pacific – Leading Firm, Corporate M& A, Projects and Resource Management (Tier 3)
- The Legal 500 Asia Pacific – Recommended Lawyers, Bridget Parham, Bryce Davey, Mark Renner, Phil Taylor, Robert Bycroft, Theresa Le Bas, Tom Arieli
- Best Lawyers 2018 – Robert Bycroft, leading authority in Biotechnology Law
- New Zealand Law Awards Finalist – Mid Size law Firm of the Year
- New Zealand Law Awards Finalist – Employer of Choice (51–100 Lawyers)
- New Zealand Law Awards Finalist – Mid-Market Deal of the Year

=== 2019 ===
- The Legal 500 Asia Pacific – Leading Firm, Corporate M& A (Tier 4), Projects and Resource Management (Tier 3)
- The Legal 500 Asia Pacific – Recommended Lawyers, Bridget Parham, Bryce Davey, Marianne Mackintosh, Mark Renner, Philip Monahan, Phil Taylor, Robert Bycroft, Theresa Le Bas, Tom Arieli
- Chambers and Partners, Asia Pacific – Liz Lim, Recognised Practitioner, Banking and Finance, New Zealand
- Best Lawyers 2019 – Robert Bycroft, leading authority in Biotechnology Law
- New Zealand Lawyer, 2019 Innovative Law Firm, Winner
- Asialaw Profiles - Notable Firm, Real Estate and Construction Law
- Asialaw Profiles - Scott Ratuki - Notable Practitioner, Construction Law
- New Zealand Law Awards Winner - Mid-Size Law Firm of the Year
- New Zealand Law Awards Winner - Managing Partner of the Year (<100 Lawyers), Jon Calder
- New Zealand Law Awards Finalist - Mid-Market Deal of the Year
- New Zealand Law Awards Finalist - Employer of Choice (51-100 Lawyers)
- International Financial Legal Review (IFLR 1000), Notable Firm, Banking and Finance

=== 2020 ===
- New Zealand Lawyer, 2020 Employer of Choice, Winner
- Best Lawyers 2020 - Robert Bycroft, leading authority in Biotechnology Law
- Best Lawyers 2020 - Mark Lowndes, leading authority in Corporate Law
- The Legal 500 Asia Pacific - Leading Firm, Banking and Finance, Corporate M& A, Dispute Resolution, Intellectual Property, Projects and Resource Management (including Environment) and Real Estate and Construction
- The Legal 500 Asia Pacific - Leading Individual, Mark Lowndes
- The Legal 500 Asia Pacific - Recommended Lawyers, Bridget Parham, James MacGillivray, Kate Cornegé, Marianne Mackintosh, Mark Hammond, Mark Renner, Peter Duncan, Peter Fanning, Phil Taylor, Scott Ratuki, Shelley Slade-Gully, Stephanie Ambler, Theresa Le Bas and Tom Arieli
- The Legal 500 Asia Pacific - Next Generation Partner, Kerri Dewe
- The Legal 500 United Kingdom - Recommended Lawyer, Wayne Hofer
- Chambers and Partners, Asia Pacific & Global - Mark Lowndes, Ranked Lawyer, Corporate/Commercial, New Zealand
- Doyles Guide - Preeminent Lawyer, Family and Relationship Property - Zandra Wackenier
- New Zealand Lawyer, 2020 Innovative Law Firms, Winner
- International Financial Legal Review (IFLR1000) - Notable Firm, Project Development (Infrastructure projects, Energy and natural resources projects, Non-commercial construction (prisons, hospitals, etc.))
- International Financial Legal Review (IFLR1000) - Notable Firm, M&A
- New Zealand Law Awards Winner - Mid-size Law Firm of the Year
- New Zealand Law Awards Winner - Managing Partner of the Year (<100 Lawyers), Jon Calder
- New Zealand Law Awards Winner - Employer of Choice (51-100 Lawyers)

=== 2021 ===
- New Zealand Lawyer, Elite Women List 2021 - Stephanie Ambler
- New Zealand Law Awards Excellence Award - M&A Deal of the Year
- New Zealand Law Awards Winner - Insolvency and Restructuring Deal of the Year
- New Zealand Law Awards Winner - Employer of Choice (51-100 Lawyers)
- New Zealand Law Awards Winner - Mid-Size Law Firm of the Year
- International Financial Legal Review (IFLR1000) - Kerri Dewe, Highly Regarded Lawyer, M&A,
- International Financial Legal Review (IFLR1000) - Mark Lowndes, Highly Regarded Lawyer, M&A, Technology and telecommunications
- International Financial Legal Review (IFLR1000) - Notable Firm, Mergers & Acquisitions 2021
- International Financial Legal Review (IFLR1000) - Notable Firm, Project Development 2021
- New Zealand Lawyer - Jon Calder, Most Influential Lawyers List 2021
- Doyles Guide - Leading Family and Relationship Property Law Firm, Tier 2
- Doyles Guide - Leading Lawyer, Family and Relationship Property - Stephanie Ambler and Zandra Wackenier
- Benchmark Litigation - Commercial and transactions, Tier 3
- Best Lawyers - Mark Lowndes, leading authority in Corporate Law, Information Technology Law and Telecommunications Law
- Best Lawyers - James MacGillivray, leading authority in Arbitration and Mediation | Litigation
- Best Lawyers - Robert Bycroft, leading authority in Biotechnology Law
- AsiaLaw Profiles - Mark Lowndes, Notable Practitioner, Corporate and M&A
- AsiaLaw Profiles - Notable Firm, Corporate and M&A, Construction, Dispute Resolution, Real Estate
- Chambers and Partners, Asia Pacific - Tompkins Wake, Dispute Resolution, Band 4
- Chambers and Partners, Asia Pacific - James MacGillivray, Dispute Resolution, Band 4
- Chambers and Partners, Asia Pacific & Global - Mark Lowndes, Corporate/Commercial, Band 4
- The Legal 500 Asia Pacific - Leading Firm, Dispute Resolution, Intellectual Property, Projects and Resources Management (including Environment), Real Estate of the realm and Construction, Corporate and M&A
- The Legal 500 Asia Pacific - Recommended Lawyers, Andrew Orme, Bridget Parham, Bryce Davey, Campbell Stewart, Fraser Wood, James MacGillivray, Kate Cornegé, Kate Searancke, Kerri Dewe, Mark Hammond, Mark Lowndes, Mark Renner, Marianne Mackintosh, Peter Duncan, Peter Fanning, Phil Taylor, Robert Bycroft, Scott Ratuki, Shelley Slade-Gully, Simon Jass, Stephanie Ambler, Theresa Le Bas and Tom Arieli

=== 2022 ===
Best Lawyers

- Best Lawyers - Mark Lowndes, Lawyer of the Year, Technology Law (Auckland)
- Best Lawyers - Robert Bycroft, leading authority in Biotechnology Law
- Best Lawyers - James MacGillivray, leading authority in Arbitration and Mediation and Litigation
- Best Lawyers - Mark Lowndes, leading authority in Corporate Law, Information Technology Law, Technology Law and Telecommunications Law.

Benchmark Litigation

- Benchmark Litigation - Commercial and transactions, Tier 3

Chambers and Partners

- Asia Pacific - Tompkins Wake, Dispute Resolution, Band 4
- Asia Pacific - James MacGillivray, Dispute Resolution, Band 4
- Asia Pacific - Mark Lowndes, Corporate/Commercial, Band 4

Doyles Guide

- Leading New Zealand Māori Law, Māori Land & Treaty of Waitangi Law Firm, Recommended
- Recommended Lawyer, Employment and Safety Law - Daniel Erickson
- Leading Family and Relationship Property Law Firm, Tier 1
- Preeminent Lawyer, Family and Relationship Property - Stephanie Ambler
- Leading Lawyer, Family and Relationship Property - Zandra Wackenier
- Recommended Lawyer, Family and Relationship Property - Kate Sullivan
- Rising Star, Family and Relationship Property - Lauren Gamble

Human Resources Director (HRD)

- 5 Star Employer of Choice 2022

NZ Law Awards

- Winner, Employer of Choice (<100 Lawyers)
- Excellence Awardee, Large Law Firm of the Year
- Excellence Awardee, Insolvency and Restructuring Deal of the Year – Liquidation of Autoterminal New Zealand Limited
- Excellence Awardee, Young Private Practice Lawyer of the Year – Tina Liu
- Excellence Awardee, Managing Partner of the Year (<100 Lawyers) – Jon Calder

NZ|Lawyer

- Rising Star - Tina Liu, Morgan Brady and Fiona Dalziel
- Elite Women - Stephanie Ambler and Theresa Le Bas

The Legal 500

- Private Practice Arbitration Powerlist - Australia and New Zealand - James MacGillivray
- Asia Pacific - Recommended Lawyers, Bridget Parham, Bryce Davey, Campbell Stewart, Fraser Wood, James MacGillivray, Kate Cornege, Kate Searancke, Kerri Dewe, Mark Hammond, Mark Lowndes, Mark Renner, Marianne Mackintosh, Peter Duncan, Peter Fanning, Phil Taylor, Robert Bycroft, Scott Ratuki, Shelley Slade-Gully, Stephanie Ambler, Theresa Le Bas, Tom Arieli and Zandra Wackenier.
- Asia Pacific - Leading Firm, Corporate and M&A, Dispute Resolution, Intellectual Property, Projects and Resources Management (including Environment), Real Estate and Construction
