= Mary Powell (suffragist) =

New Zealand temperance worker and suffragist

- Born: Mary Sadler Powell; 14 December 1854; Methwold, Norfolk, England
- Died: 8 March 1946 (aged 91); Dunedin, New Zealand

Mary Sadler Powell (14 December 1854 – 8 March 1946) was a New Zealand temperance worker and suffragist.

== Life ==
Powell was born in Methwold, Norfolk, England in 1854, to William Powell, a Methodist clergyman, and Mary (née Sadler). After the death of her mother in 1885, she emigrated to New Zealand, where she lived with her brother. She was active with the Invercargill branch of the Women's Christian Temperance Union New Zealand (WCTU NZ) She served as president of the Invercargill branch, which became the second largest branch of the WCTU in New Zealand. Powell stayed active in the WCTU NZ for over 30 years, working as a corresponding secretary, recording secretary, and organiser. In 1890, she attended her first national convention. In 1900, she attended the WCTU World biennial convention in London. She was made a life member in 1919.

Powell wrote a column promoting the Christian life for young women under the pen name "Aunt Kate" for the New Zealand Methodist. She also supported women's right to vote.

Powell never married. She died on 8 March 1946 in Dunedin, at the age of 91.
