= Arthur Tompkins (New Zealand judge) =

New Zealand judge and art crime expert

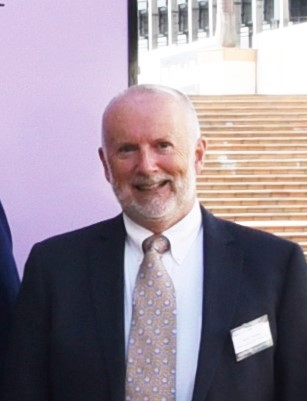
Tompkins in 2018

Arthur Irwin Manning Tompkins is a New Zealand lawyer, judge, author and art crime expert. He has served as a District Court judge since 1997, and is also a judge of the Pitcairn Supreme Court. He is a trustee of the New Zealand Art Crime Research Trust.

Tompkins is the son of Sir David Tompkins.
