= Ida Hoff =

Swiss physician (1880–1952)

Ida Hoff (8 January 1880 - 5 August 1952) was a medical doctor and feminist activist in Switzerland. She was the first woman to be employed as a school doctor in Bern. In a traditionalist city in a conservative area of Switzerland, Ida Hoff was one of Bern's first regular female motorists.

== Life ==
=== Family provenance and early years ===
Adelaide "Ida" Hoff was born in Moscow. Her father, Siegfried Hoff (ca.1845-1896), had been born into a prosperous German Jewish family, and had emigrated to the United States, taking US citizenship. According to one source, Siegfried Hoff was regarded by family members as the "black sheep" of the family. At some stage he had trained as a dentist. However, he had left the United States and, from the perspective of his respectable brother Leopold who lived near Hamburg and ran the family manufacturing business, Siegfried had "disappeared" into czarist Russia where he supported himself as a businessman. The family business had been established by Ida's grandfather, Johann Hoff, and involved manufacturing a Malt Extract health tonic which sold well in the German speaking world. It also sold well in Russia, where "Hoff's Elixir" even got a mention in the 1880 novel The Brothers Karamazov by Fyodor Dostoyevsky (1821–1881). As a child Ida Hoff grew up in circumstances of some material comfort, possibly reflecting her father's success as a health tonic salesman.

Anna Naschatir (1861–1901) was the "impoverished cousin" of Siegfried Hoff's landlord. She had been born in Daugavpils which today is in Latvia but at that time would have been regarded as a prosperous city to the south of St. Petersburg in the western part of the Russian Empire. Anna was at least sixteen years younger than Siegfried. It is not clear whether they married out of love or from dynastic calculations. The marriage ceremony, conducted towards the end of 1878 in St. Petersburg, was a lavish affair. The couple's only child, Adelaide "Ida" Hoff, was born a little over a year later. However, the marriage was a joyless one. Anna and Siegfried separated in the mid 1880s, although they were formally divorced only in 1890. It was possibly a reflection of the stigma surrounding divorce that later Ida would explain that she had grown up in a one-parent family in the context of her father's early death, which was not completely untrue. (Her father died in 1896.) Despite being a one parent family, it appears that the divorce settlement left Anna and her daughter well provided for financially.

=== Escape to Switzerland ===
Before Ida reached school age, in 1886 Anna, still not quite 25, moved with her daughter to Switzerland. Hundreds of other young Russian women were making the same journey at this time, especially those from an intellectual milieu or with a record of political awareness. The czarist regime in Russia was becoming increasingly despotic and paranoid, persecuting opponents where it identified them, placing Jews under pressure and blocking the way to higher education for women. Many of the young women fleeing Russia settled in the Zürich districts Fluntern and Hottingen, on the city's eastern side. Anna Hoff was one of these, although unlike most of them she had very little interest in politics or in fermenting revolution in Russia: the focus of her life was more on her own personal development and on looking after her little daughter. The woman running the guest house in which they lived described her – with evident approval – as an educated, quiet and reliable person ("[eine] gebildete, stille und solide Person").

Despite the landlady's evaluation, Anna's school education had been relatively basic, and not sufficient as a basis for enrolling as a university student. She was able to listen to lectures as an "Auskultantin". She attended philosophy lectures given by Ludwig Stein. Anna was determined that her daughter's path to serious study should not be blocked in the way hers had been.

=== Citizenship for Anna: Bereavement and Education for Ida ===
During the final days of 1892 Anna Hoff and her daughter moved to Bern. It is not clear whether the move from Zürich to Bern had anything to do with Ludwig Stein's move to the University of Bern which took place at about the same time. Stein, like the Hoffs, was of Jewish provenance and he was also, according to at least one source, a dazzling figure. He lived in high bourgeois style in a city villa where guests were always welcome. He was supportive of his friends, but in academic circles he was controversial, and in 1909 he would be forced to give up his teaching chair at the university, after which he moved to Berlin. While Ida was growing up, her mother was a frequent visitor to Stein's Bern villa. In 1896/97, when Anna applied for Swiss citizenship for a second time, Stein went out of his way to champion her application. On the occasion of her first application, in 1893, the city authorities had accepted that she was not involved in politics, but had nevertheless determined that having lived in Switzerland for six years was insufficient to justify citizenship. It was not till 1897, after news came through that her ex-husband had died the previous year, that the authorities gave Anna Hoff the green light for naturalisation. For reasons that remain unclear it was now Anna who did not pursue the matter, however.

Anna Hoff was by now increasingly affected by chronic kidney disease. In 1901 she visited Küssnacht in search of a cure. It was here, in October 1901, that Anna Hoff died, aged around 40 in the guest house "Villa Clara" where she was staying. Ida was greatly affected by her mother's death, and it is clear that the mother:daughter bond between them had been exceptionally close. Landlocked Switzerland was unusual in western Europe with regard to the vanishingly low levels of naturally occurring iodine in the national diet, a deficiency that has subsequently been addressed by adding iodine to salt sold in the shops. Later, in a medical dissertation, Ida Hoff addressed issues involved in kidney disease in a piece of work entitled "On the question of salt retention in kidney disease" ("Über die Frage der Kochsalzretention bei Nephritis [...]").

As a school student Ida Hoff was already actively concerned with women's rights. Activism was not the only thing that marked her out from fellow students. She attended a Gymnasium (school with an academic focus) in Bern. It had only been in 1894 that public secondary schools in Bern had started to accept female students. By the time she passed her Matura (school final exams) in 1899 Ida Hoff was one of just two girls in her class at the Bern Literary Gymnasium ("Berner Literatur-Gymnasium'"). The other one, Clara Winnicki (after 1925 Clara Herbrand), also achieved subsequent feminist notability as the first qualified female pharmacist in Switzerland with her own business.

=== Student years and activism ===
Hoff enrolled as a medical student at the University of Bern in 1899. She would flourish at university where, again, she was something of a pioneer. There were indeed plenty of Russian female students studying at western universities. That reflected the all-male nature of universities in Russia. But most of the Russians stayed Russian, spending their spare time with fellow Russians. Ida Hoff was evidently keen from the outset to become assimilated in Swiss society. In order to avoid becoming isolated, she was one of a group of Bern students who founded the "Bern Female Students' Association" ("Berner Studentinnenverein"). The female students conducted themselves with some confidence, participating as a group in the opening ceremony in 1903 of a new college building in the city's Grosse Schanze quarter which they made memorable by turning up carrying the slogan "Equal rights - Equal obligations" ("gleiche Rechte – gleiche Pflichten"). Subsequently, they defended themselves against sexist attacks.

Within the group Hoff found like minded contemporaries several of whom became firm lifelong friends. One of these was the international peace activist and (later) professor of biochemistry, Gertrud Woker (1878 - 1968). Another was the mathematician Annie Reineck (later Annie Leuch-Reineck) 1880 - 1978) who became the longstanding president of the Swiss league for Women's Voting Rights. The chronicler of the Swiss feminist movement, Agnes Vogel (later Agnes Debrit-Vogel 1892 - 1974), also earned her activist spurs as a member of the "Bern Female Students' Association".

Frida Kaiser (later Frida Imboden-Kaiser 1877 - 1962) was a contemporary of Ida Hoff who later became a pediatrician at St. Gallen and a campaigner against high levels of infant mortality. The two of them first met at the "Aebischlössli" student hostel. Kaiser helped Hoff find a job as an assistant at the medical Uni-Clinic with the intermist, Hermann Sahli. It was also Kaiser who found Hoff a lawyer who advised and backed her in a renewed - and this time successful - application for Swiss citizenship.

The small but determined group of female students used to meet together each Saturday at the homely "Daheim Women's Restaurant" in Bern's Zeughausgasse (literally: "Armoury Alley") to analyse and bemoan examples of anti-feminism. They also organised lectures, readings and stage events. Hoff herself was never short of imaginative ideas, and helped with production of their association news-sheet.

The "Bern Female Students' Association" became a crucible for the Women's Voting Rights movement. To Hoff it never made sense that women in Switzerland should be able to participate in the workplace, the professions, society and family life, but not in politics. She also recognised that her own education was a privilege, and one that she owed to the women's movement, and this provided an impetus behind several years of intense participation in the executive committee of the "Bern Women's Voting Rights Association" ("Frauenstimmrechtsverein Bern"). But she also campaigned on other social and political issues. She called for the introduction of universal old age and disability insurance (which was finally introduced following a referendum in 1947) and involved herself in the 1933 "Women and Democracy" movement which campaigned for the preservation of democracy in the face of the rising tide of right wing populism which was a feature of the times.

=== Junior doctor: Senior doctor ===
In later life Ida Hoff liked to recall an experience she had during her time in Berlin which highlighted just how unfamiliar people found the idea of a woman doctor during the early years of the twentieth century in Europe. Finding herself needing to visit a sick patient without delay she summoned a droschke (horse-taxi). After she had been sitting in the conveyance for a few moments without anything happening she asked the driver, "Why don't you start?", "I'm waiting for the doctor.", "I am the doctor", pause, "I've heard about something like that; but I've never come across it!". Eventually the droschke driver was persuaded to set off.

Ida Hoff passed her national qualifying exams in Summer 1905 and arranged to move to Berlin in order to obtain experience as a medical assistant at the Moabit Hospital there. It was also in Berlin, at the Women's Clinic of the Charité teaching hospital, that she worked on her dissertation "Beitrag zur Histologie der Schwangerschaft im rudimentären Nebenhorn", a gynaecological study on an aspect of pregnancy: this earned her a doctorate from Bern in 1906. Her doctorate was supervised by the pathologist Theodor Langhans.

Following her return to Bern, even her friends found it sensational that Hoff, as a woman, was able to win the confidence of the great internist, Hermann Sahli, who in 1911 appointed her his senior assistant and then as a senior doctor. As matters turned out, her career with the Uni-Clinic was a brief one. Her appointment at the Sahli's medical Uni-Clinic nevertheless represented a double breakthrough. She was both female and Jewish. Hoff did not engage in Jewish religious practices, but she made no attempt to hide her Jewish provenance and stood out uncompromisingly in opposition to any antisemitic manifestations that she encountered.

=== Self employed medical practitioner ===
In April 1911 the cantonal authorities granted her a license to open her own medical surgery. Soon after this she left her employment and her "service apartment" at the medical Uni-Clinic and moved into her own premises in the Marktgasse ("Market Street") where she opened a medical practice for internal medicine. A year later she moved to larger premises in the Amthausgasse (literally:Office-building Street). Both were centrally located in the heart of the old city.

Hoff moved into self employment with some misgivings. At that time, in the whole of Bern, there were just four female doctors working in general practice, compared to 128 male colleagues. Her doubts proved unfounded, however, and she very quickly found she had plenty of patients. She inspired confidence with her sound, always up to date medical knowledge, a strong sense of responsibility, a certain imperturbable calmness on approach and a powerful determination to do good. Her diagnoses were almost always correct and she communicated them with honesty, clarity, and appropriate sensitivity.

In September 1913 she was able to present herself as Bern's first female in the directors office of the city's principal secondary school for girls. The occasion was given added piquancy by the fact that it was in this same school director's office that, as a child she had been reprimanded twenty years earlier on account of her "excessively high spirited conduct". Once regular medical checkups had been established as a feature of school life, equivalent controls were introduced for other schools in Bern. Over the next 32 years Ida Hoff developed the service, inoculating hundreds of girls and providing to parents, every spring, reports about their daughters' physical development, although she tended to not refer to these aspects of her work in public speeches. Her programme for the children included gymnastics, prophylaxis and hygiene, metaphorically "removing the stockings from the dirty feet and legs". Reflecting the endemic medical problems of the time and place, she was involved in struggles against several major epidemics of tuberculosis, flu and scarlet fever.

Hoff was also centrally involved in the Swiss move to cut down Thyroide ("Kropf") disease. A driving force behind this campaign was the medical professor Fritz de Quervain (1868-1940). In 1923 de Quervain asserted that the Swiss people, so richly over endowed with goitres, should be able to look forward to a golden age unencumbered by these swellings. He noticed that goitre was rare among the children in the Jura region where the public water supply included naturally occurring iodine, and there was also iodine in locally sourced table salt and milk. There was virtually no naturally occurring iodine in the Bern diet, however. Researchers at the time determined that there was very likely to be a connection between the absence of dietary iodine and thyroid disease in Bern. As a schools doctor Hoff engaged in the campaign. Girls were given special sweets/candies containing iodine, flavoured and bulked out with fortifying malt extract. Although the formulation for the tablets may have been connected with the Hamburg-based Hoff family business, the special "Majowa" sweets provided to school children in Bern were produced in Bern by Wander AG the at the Ovalmaltine factory. The campaign was a great success. After seven years the number of children with goitre induced by Iodine deficiency was down from 60% to 10%.

Ida Hoff produced tables illustrating the success of the campaign against goitre. The tables were exhibited in 1928 at the first ever SAFFA (Schweizeische Ausstellung für Frauenarbeit "Swiss Exhibition for Women's Work"). The exhibition attracted ten times more visitors than had been anticipated and took in ten million francs. The delighted all-female organising team, having captured popular attention, also dragged a giant model of a snail round Bern in order to illustrate the speed with which their campaign for women to have the chance to vote was progressing. Hoff enjoyed her part in the event.

She also involved herself in the accompanying programme of publicity. Her work as a school doctor was celebrated in a frieze produced by Hannah Egger (1881 - 1965) for the "[female] School doctor room" at the SAFFA (exhibition). Not withstanding her other activities, it was her work as a school doctor that most defined Hoff's work, and the necessary intensity of this work was redoubled during the early 1940s because of the need to recruit and train up additional female colleagues to make of for male colleagues whose medical skills had been redeployed to war related work caused by the international war in which all the states surrounding Switzerland (other than Liechtenstein) had directly involved themselves. In May 1945 the war in Europe ended, however, and Hoff, who had celebrated her sixty-fifth birthday a few months earlier, retired from her work as a schools doctor.

=== Anna Tumarkin: friend and partner ===
Anna Tumarkin (1875-1951) became a distinguished Swiss philosopher. Tumarkin had been born in Dubrowna in the Russian Empire, but had ended up in Bern where her brilliant academic career included a number of "firsts". She was the first woman at Bern university - and only the third in Switzerland - to obtain a Habilitation (higher academic qualification). The two women also had their Jewish provenance in common. Tumarkin was five years older than Hoff, and had originally been an acquaintance of Ida's mother, Anna Hoff. The two Annas - the "Auskultantin" Anna Hoff and the enrolled student Anna Tumarkin - met up in the welcoming ambience of the open house kept by the philosophy lecturer Ludwig Stein, and during the 1890s they took to sitting together in lectures at the university.

More than a decade after her mother's death, and more than one year after establishing herself as a self-employed medical practitioner, Ida Hoff moved to larger premises in the Amthausgasse in the heart of the old city. With space to spare, she persuaded Anna Tumarkin to move in. Tumarkin had already attracted attention as Bern's first female professor. What began as a practical house sharing arrangement blossomed into a lifelong partnership between the two women. In Spring 1921 they moved together into a new home in the Hallwylstrasse, a few buildings along the street from the (subsequently much enlarged) Swiss National Library. They filled their home "with beautiful old furniture" and set aside a room as their own library, containing "much sought after books". In 1925, for the first time, Hoff and Tumarkin together visited Tumarkin's family in Chișinău, which at that time was in Romania.

In character and temperament Hoff and Tumarkin were completely different. Hoff was a forceful and practical character who faced the world with determination, warm cheerfulness, and "eyes wide open". Tumarkin had an "other worldly" aspect: she was more focused on abstract thought, and instinctively sought to bring every question back to basic principals. Hoff was able to sensitize her friend to the practical need for women to be given the vote, so that Tumarkin became a supporter, and indeed helped to compile a catalogue of women's literature for the SAFFA (exhibition). Doctor Hoff hugely admired the philosopher's scholarship, frequent flashes of intellectual brilliance and endless curiosity driven academic research. Professor Tumarkin appreciated the security provided by the doctor's boundless capacity for nurture.

There is no compelling evidence for or against the inevitable mutterings that the two became lesbian lovers. On the subject of marriage, in a discussion that apparently referenced her own intensively lived life, Ida Hoff on one occasion remarked, "With a man, I really never would know where I should start." ("Ich wüsste wirklich nicht, was ich noch mit einem Mann anfangen sollte!"). Friends concluded that she had never felt the need to marry because her work absorbed all her capacities for "limitless devotion" and "true self sacrifice". It is certainly true that she sometimes deferred her scheduled holidays because she needed to look after her sick patients.

=== Automobiliste and tourist ===
Hoff and Tumarkin were lovers of nature and of the arts. This was part of what pushed Hoff into becoming one of Bern's first female car owners and also one of the first doctors in the city who learned to visit her patients' homes by car without a chauffeur. Bern's license plates for motor vehicles began with the number "1000": Hoff's car carried the license plate "2151". While she was learning to drive she had a recurring nightmare involving children who had been run over. She therefore drove her car elegantly but with extreme care through the city streets. When they had free time the two women liked to drive in the mountain road network being constructed in the countryside towards Interlaken to the east and the Lake of Geneva to the south. Hoff had at one stage wanted to study Biology, and was enthusiastic about the natural splendours of the mountain roads, alongside which "no flower could hide in the undergrowth". On Sundays the women also liked to visit culturally important towns, country churches and interesting local museums. Another member of the expeditions, sometimes, was the local artist Rudolf Münger (1862-1929). Münger had been persuaded by his sister-in-law, Luise "Lysi" Münger Leder to paint a portrait of Ida Hoff in 1923. With his wife, Heidi, he liked to accompany Hoff and Tumarkin on their Sunday afternoon drives to favourite walking locations such as the Schwarzsee and nearby Fribourg. Münger recorded in a diary his enthusiastic or critical impressions of art works or natural features encountered during these afternoon excursions.

The cultural highlight of Hoff's and Tumarkin's shared travel experiences took them beyond the surrounding cantons, however, and involved a visit to Greece in the spring of 1927 which they undertook with a travel company called, appropriately, the "Hellasgesellschaft". Tumarkin recorded her impressions in a "travel book" and contributed a lengthy reportage to "Der kleine Bund".

=== Sharing the suffering: family ===
Hoff and Tumarkin were both Jewish, with relatives in parts of Europe that were badly affected by the Shoah. In 1925 and 1937, the friends made two lengthy visits to Tumarkin's relatives in Chișinău, then a part of Greater Romania, today in Moldova. The city had been the scene of ferocious antisemitic pogroms at the start of the twentieth century, and the coming to power in Germany of the Hitler government paved the way for race-based persecution and slaughter in the 1940s as the German and Soviet armies fought for control over the Bessarabia region. Many of Tumarkin's family were horribly persecuted, deported, and in some cases killed.

Li Carstens was the daughter of Ida Hoff's first cousin, Clara Carstens-Hoff. (This made Li Carstens a first cousin once removed to Ida Hoff.) In 1936 mother and daughter, Clara and Li, visited their cousin Ida and Ida's friend Anna in Bern. Some decades later, Li Carstens recalled some impressions of that visit for Franziska Rogger:

"I was deeply impressed by the general cultural and at the same time friendly atmosphere reigning in the Hallwylstrasse home of the two ladies. [...] Professor Tumarkin impressed me because she seemed so eminently full of wisdom and learning. ... Ida in my eyes was a bit less awe-inspiring than Tumarkin, but she too was an intellectual; a serene and apparently quite cheerful and altogether lovable personality, and I liked her very much. She and my mother talked a lot together - Ida I think was a good listener and I can remember her voice especially when she uttered ja-a [i.e. "ye-es"] during listening phases. She uttered a whole sequence of jajaja each time, no loud exclamations though."

While Ida's father, Siegfried Hoff (ca. 1845-1896) had emigrated, first to the United States and later to the Russian Empire, his elder brother Leopold Hoff had remained in Hamburg and managed the family firm. In 1905, newly qualified, Ida Hoff had traveled to Berlin to gain medical experience. She had taken an indirect route, traveling via Hamburg to visit her Uncle Leopold's family. On that occasion she had made a deep impression on her cousin Clara, both on account of her "unconventional lifestyle" and because of the surgical skill with which she dissected a roast chicken.

The cousins remained in touch, and in the summer of 1936 Cousin Clara, who had not yet been deprived of her German passport by the Nazis, but nevertheless by this stage had relocated to the Netherlands, visited Ida and her friend Anna. By this time Clara Carstens-Hoff had a teenage daughter of her own, Li Carstens, who accompanied her mother on the family visit to Switzerland. Li, like her mother 21 years earlier, was deeply impressed by Ida.

Cousin Clara and her daughter survived the Hitler years. Other relatives, friends and acquaintances were killed. Hoff and Tumarkin were badly affected by the gruesome fate of relatives. As their friend and confidant Georgine Gerhard recalled after Hoff's death, "that such horrors could be inflicted on the Jews without a storm of indignation bursting out across the entire world weighed on them heavily. Ida was also deeply unsettled by the less than laudable reactions of the Swiss authorities in dealing with holocaust refugees, and some of the manifestations of antisemitism within Switzerland."

=== Final years ===
Hoff's final years were not entirely untroubled. She suffered problems with her ears which made it necessary for her to undergo periodic surgical interventions which were very painful. She also developed heart problems. More painful, however, was the illness and suffering of her friend Anna Tumarkin. Despite the care Hoff was able to lavish on her dying friend, eventually Tumarkin, now aged 75, had to be transferred to the "Siloah Diakonissenhaus" in Gümligen, on the south side of the city in the direction of Thun. Anna Tumarkin now faded away rapidly, dying six weeks later on 7 August 1951.

Hoff's own will to live never entirely returned. She tried to channel her energies into work as much as possible. She also formulated new travel plans. An invitation to visit her cousin Clara - now living in Sweden - provided an element of light at the end of her tunnel of grieving. But her failing heart left her short of energy. She was forced to rest during the morning hours, only able to emerge towards the end of the afternoon to attend to a few long time patients. On the afternoon of 4 August 1952, by now aged 72, her heart began to fail more completely, and she died early the next morning, a couple of days before the first anniversary of Anna's death.

Her body was cremated: the ashes were placed in an urn in Anna Tumarkin's grave in Bern's Bremgarten Cemetery.
