= Clara Winnicki =

Swiss pharmacist

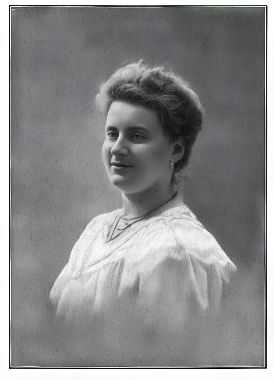
Clara Winnicki (1880-1941)

Clara Winnicki (Note: Alternative spellings of her family name are also used, including "Winnitzki", "Winnizki" and "Winnicky") (10 November 1880 – 6. May 1941) became Switzerland's first qualified female pharmacist in 1905, and went on to open and operate a succession of pharmacies. Commercial success eluded her, however. By 2018 the profession had become highly feminised: more than two thirds of Switzerland's qualified pharmacists were female; but there are indications that during the early decades of the twentieth century her gender placed Clara Winnicki at a professional disadvantage. In 1925 she married a Swiss-based German pharmacist who was not permitted to practice his profession in Switzerland. As a result of marrying a foreign man Clara Winnicki lost her citizen's rights as a Swiss citizen. In 1933 the couple were expelled across the frontier into Germany, having been identified by the authorities as "foreigners without means of support".

== Life ==
=== Provenance and early years ===
Clara Emma Winnicki was born in Bern. Leopold Winnicki, her father, was an engineer who had arrived from Poland as an immigrant, and then acquired Swiss citizenship through the legal process of naturalization. Her mother, born Carolina Emma Elisabeth Sulser, was a secondary school teacher from Bern. Clara Winnicki had four siblings. She became one of the first girls to attend a Gymnasium (school with an academic focus) in Bern. It was only in 1894 that public secondary schools in Bern had started to accept female students. By the time she passed her Matura (school final exams) in 1899 Clara Winnicki was one of just two girls left in her class at the Bern Literary Gymnasium ("Berner Literatur-Gymnasium'"). The other one was Ida Hoff, who also achieved subsequent feminist notability, becoming a pioneering physician.

=== Student years ===
On 18 April 1900 Clara Winnicki enrolled at the University of Bern, becoming the university's first ever female student in Pharmacy. She mastered the study material without difficulty. The problems came with trying to obtain the internship necessary to complete the course, as she later explained in a talk:

- "The greatest [difficulty], probably, was that none of the pharmacists that you asked wanted to take upon himself the risk of being the first to have a female pharmacist in the shop. The gentlemen were greatly concerned that the public would react with hostility to the intrusion of a female, that a female apprentice would not have the necessary strength to undertake the work and that a lady would have to be treated with too much respect and forbearance". (Note: "Als ich als erster weiblicher Apotheker der Schweiz meine Laufbahn begann, da stellten sich mir beinahe unüberwindliche Schwierigkeiten in den Weg .... Die größte war wohl die, dass keiner der Apotheker, die man aufragte, das Wagnis auf sich nehmen wollte, die erste Fachgenossin in die Pharmazie einzuführen. Die Herren hatten großes Bedenken, dass das Publikum dem weiblichen Eindringling feindlich gegenüberstehen würde, dass dem weiblichen Praktikanten die nötigen Kräfte zur Ausübung des Berufes fehlten und dass man einer Dame zu viel Schonung und Rücksicht entgegenbringen müsste".)

After a long and difficult search, Winnicki eventually found a pharmacist prepared to offer her the necessary internship. She had been intending to find an internship in French-speaking western Switzerland which then, as now, was widely viewed as more socially and politically progressive than the conservative heartlands of German-speaking central Switzerland. In the end, however, she was obliged to accept an internship contract with a pharmacist closer to home, in a "small Bernese provincial town", on terms that she would describe later as "unfavourable". Student contemporaries, presumably intending to be helpful, offered advice. She was urged that the smart thing to do would be to take care of housekeeping and cooking rather than trying to force her way into one of the "liberal professions". Another confided that he found it exceptionally unaesthetic for a lady to have to scramble up a ladder in order to get medications down from the shelves.

In 1905 Clara Winnicki became the first woman to pass the Swiss National Exams for Pharmacists. Her certificate is dated 13 November 1905. If she had been involved in a race, she would have beaten her nearest rival by a year. Hedwig Delpy from Zürich became the second woman to pass the national exams in Pharmacy only in 1906. Passing the exam gave her official authorisation to manage a pharmacy, and for eight months, between April and November 1906, Winnicki managed the "Apotheke Masson" (pharmacy) in Langenthal.

It turned out that in order to acquire and manage her own pharmacy business it would be helpful for Winnicki to pursue her student career further. She returned to the University of Bern and worked on a doctorate under the supervision of Prof. Alexander Tschirch. She received her doctorate on 28 February 1907 in return for a "contribution on the developmental history of the flowers of some officially [approved medicinal] plants". The dissertation included a dedication to her parents.

=== Biel/Bienne pharmacist ===
In April 1907 Clara Winnicki purchased the "Apotheke Bonjour", a pharmacy business on the little town of Biel, a midsized town some 100 km across the hills to the north-west of Bern. The name of the business reflects the bilingual character of Biel, which is set on the language frontier between German speaking and French speaking Switzerland. For Winnicki it was not enough to stand behind the counter and make herself agreeable to the customers. She also used the room at the back of the shop as a little laboratory in which she prepared her own range of pills and potions. "Migrainite" tablets were a headache treatment: "Pilulesroses" was designed to address Anaemia. Later she also developed a sore throat treatment in a pharmacists' bottle, advertised as an "Anticatarrhol".

=== Activism ===
Over time, Winnicki's pioneering achievements in breaking through into a traditionally all-male profession attracted a growing volume of media coverage: she herself emerged after approximately 1914 as a prominent advocate for women's rights in the profession, using both her pen and the platforms provided by public meetings. On 14 December 1917 she addressed a meeting at the "Casino Bern" concert hall on the theme "Die Frau im Apothekerberuf" ("The Woman in the Pharmacy Profession"). The same title was used at around this time for articles she wrote, notably for the "Schweizerische Apotheker-Zeitung". She told of difficulties she had encountered in her professional career, but also shared her assessment that in her pharmacy there was no persisting "women question", and absolute pay equality had been achieved. She spoke of her pride that professional colleague now took her seriously, and a Swiss Pharmacists' Convention had passed a resolution to encourage young women to study pharmacy. But she also warned audiences that this excellent situation must be defended. Vigilance was necessary: "We now have no 'women question' in our profession. Take care that the relationships stay that way. Any time you accept a new job, forcefully reject any terms that do not place you on an equal footing with male colleagues. Doing anything else will do great harm not just to you, but, to all your female comrades, to whom you are also responsible in these matters". She was also keen to remind her listeners that female pharmacists should always take on both the same duties and the same responsibilities as their male counterparts. That did not mean they should necessarily always make their contributions in precisely the same way. The taking in of heavy deliveries could certainly be left to the boys, while circumstances might easily arise where women would more easily listen with patience and sympathy to customers describing their painful symptoms.

She also robustly rejected any notion that women were more suitable for pharmacists' duties because of their demure modesty and docility. There was nothing docile in the way she declared, "We are not modest, and nor should we be. .... We know precisely our own worth". And she highlighted the systematic failure to recognise women's potential, citing the example of the continuing way in which women were still finding it much harder to secure internships in pharmacy businesses than men.. She campaigned vehemently for equality of training opportunities. There were, to be sure, hardened feminist battlers, but they would not have progressed to their roles of "sweet graceful sylphides" in the pharmacy profession if they had always just stuck to their knitting. In a contribution to the specialist weekly journal "Schweizerische Wochenschrift für Chemie und Pharmazie", Winnicki elegantly concluded with a flourish in Latin: "Vivant, floreant, crescant, commilitones feminigeneris!". (Note: "Comrade students of the female gender:live, flourish and grow!")

=== Bern pharmacist ===
In 1914 Winnicki closed her pharmacy in Biel/Bienne and moved to Bern, to try her luck with a larger business in a larger city. In commercial terms she was not conspicuously successful, however, and the business had to be liquidated, after eight years, in 1922. There were critics who did not hold back, their observations tinged with more than a hint of implicit sexism: "... Miss Winitzki simply did not have the capacity to manage her business, above all lacking the energy necessary to manage businesses like these". (Note: "... que demoiselle Winitzki n'avait tout simplement pas été de taille a gérer ses affaires ayant manque surtout de l’énergie nécessaire dans la conduite d' entreprises de ce genre».") It was said that she had demonstrated neither appropriate administrative competence nor entrepreneurial flair, and spent too much time floating around "in the intellectual spheres of the old classics". It was true that Clara Winnicki was an enthusiastic reader of the classical texts, and she defended her enthusiasm for the ancient wisdom with her characteristic vigour: "... the study of the ancient languages is a thing of great beauty which brings much to the general education of the pharmacist .... the pharmacist [can thereby be preserved from] monochrome mental ossification and evaluate all the real human questions with an open mind."

After the collapse of her Bern pharmacy in 1922, having run down any savings that she might previously have acquired, Clara Winnicki gave up on owning her own business and started to look for work as an employee. In response to a newspaper job advertisement she applied for a position with a pharmacist called Dr. phil. August Herbrand who needed an administrator for his pharmacy at Adelboden, a farming village with aspirations to become a successful health resort, in the mountains south of Bern. Winnicki was offered the post and accepted it.

=== August Herbrand ===
August Herbrand had been born in Koblenz in 1869, which made him approximately eleven years older than Winnicki. His father had owned a pharmacy and August passed the appropriate exams "with distinction" in order to follow in his father's career path. Shortly before the end of the nineteenth century he had undertaken a period of study at Basel and then moved to Lausanne where he obtained his doctorate. He returned to Switzerland in 1912, accepting a senior management position at a factory producing "pharmaceutical preparations", owned by a Dr. Wanderanstellen. Two years later war broke out and in August 1914 Herbrand returned to Germany and volunteered for military service. As an artillery lieutenant serving in northern France he was wounded on several occasions and also contracted Gout. He sought to dull the pain with morphine, thereby acquiring a drug depency which seems to have stayed with him for the rest of his life.

By the time Herbrand arrived in Adelboden directly after the end of the war, he was already on his third marriage. He arrived in order to work for the local pharmacist, Theodor Hopf, who was known to be terminally ill. After Hopf died, in 1919, Herbrand was keen to take charge at the shop counter of the Adelboden pharmacy. However, although he was fully qualified for the work, he had received his qualification in Germany. He had no Swiss qualification for work as a pharmacist. The cantonal health authorities in Bern threatened to close down the business, which would have been a career blow for Herbrand and would also have left Adelboden without a pharmacist at a time when the village was trying to recover its reputation as a health resort. Despite the carnage of war, there had been few German, French or Italian convalescent patients with the inclination and opportunity to visit Swiss health resorts between 1914 and 1918: those that had come had tended to be more than averagely wealthy, and inclined to prefer the well-established and better publicised locations such as Davos. Herbrand, still aged only 50 in 1919, should have been able to find his way round the problem by passing the necessary Swiss exams in Pharmacy. His preferred option turned out to involve recruiting a management-level administrator for Adelboden who was already in possession of the necessary qualifications, however. The arrival on the scene of Clara Winnicki, aged 43 in 1922. was an answer to prayer. She not only already held the necessary Swiss qualifications, but had proven experience of running a pharmacy over more than a decade. The threat that the authorities might close down his Adelboden pharmacy was lifted. It was also a welcome development from the perspective of the local council which had already shared their assessment that "the presence of a reliable pharmacy [was] an essential requirement" for the revival of health tourism locally.

=== Marriage? ===
The teaming up together of Clara Winnicki and August Herbrand evidently looked like something of a lifesaver for both of them. Winnicki had found a man who came with a pharmacy business that she could consider her own. Herbrand hoped that through Clara's efficient management the pharmacy could flourish and become a veritable gold mine. For both of them, the obvious next step was marriage.

An impediment to their marriage was Herbrand's third wife, born Mathilde Schlicht. In the divorce case that followed, Mathilde would testify that Herbrand had taken over the assets she had brought to their union and managed to work his way through the lot on account of his dissolute lifestyle and morphine addiction. Herbrand, in return, would testify that she had constantly criticised and denigrated him. Slightly surprisingly, Winnicki also testified on behalf of her husband, stating that Herbrand's third wife had asked her about the modalities for finding a drug that could be used to poison her husband without leaving evidential traces. The divorce was granted in March 1924: poor Mathilde Schlicht ended her days wrecked in an institution for the insane.

Slightly less than a year after the divorce, on 28 February 1925, August Herbrand (56) and Clara Winnicki (45) were married to each other at Adelboden. By marrying a foreigner, Clara Winnicki lost her Swiss citizenship rights. As matters turned out, that was only one of a number of major difficulties that she would face following the marriage.

=== Married life in the village ===
As far as the business was concerned, Adelboden turned out to be a challenging location. Even though the pharmacy she shared with her husband was apparently then only one in the village managed by a fully qualified pharmacist, there was plenty of competition from the doctors in the surrounding villages who supplied patients from their own private pharmacies, both legally and illegally. Those private pharmacies were generally operated by a completely unqualified assistant - the doctor's wife! Members of the local medical community teamed up together to oppose Winnicki's plans for a drug laboratory linked to the pharmacy. There were complaints that the Herbrand Pharmacy was setting its prices too high, and more complaints when the pharmacy started to offer veterinary services. Further complaints arose when it became known that Herbrand was planning to close the pharmacy outside the tourist seasons.

There were family problems too, involving adult children from Herbrand's previous marriages. One of these, Wilhelm Herbrand, had already been expelled from the country in 1921 following allegations of fraud. Another, Margarethe, had recently endured a marriage break-down which she blamed on her father and his latest wife. She believed that they had never accepted her choice of husband, a certain Baron von Plotho who had a title, but no more tangible assets. Von Plotho had indeed clashed with Herbrand, whom he accused of "Morphinusmus" (morphine dependency) and of having become totally dependent on his wife. Angry accusations of insanity had been exchanged.

In the end even the local authorities became aware of August Herbrand's high level of morphine dependency. When confronted, Herbrand would insist that morphine was the only effective remedy against the symptoms of Gout, which he had acquired as a consequence of the war. He drew attention to the various withdrawal cures he had attended - apparently to no good effect - and swore that in his pharmacy he had always adheredf to the legal regulations. Clara Winnicki co-signed a statement to that effect. She also let her husband know that she was not prepared to accept as a "nurse" the "Nebenbuhlerin" (loosely, "whore on the side") whom he had brought back with him from one of his famous "rehabilitation cures". Herbrand was obliged to obey, since he had become completely dependent on his wife's earnings for his own livelihood.

=== A bitter ending ===
Customers drained away from the Herbrand-Winnickis' "Pharmacie Internationale" in Adelboden. Unrestrained and excessive use of morphine, alcohol and tobacco destroyed confidence in the proprietor's pharmaceutical competence and, indeed, in that of his wife. The couple became increasingly unloved within the village community. August Herbrand would be remembered locally as that "Prussian knight, arrogant and over-schooled", who had socialised only with notable folk. Behind this memorable characterisation, memories have faded in the village of the "white-haired lady who stood behind the counter". Loss of confidence in Herbrand was accompanied by a further collapse in the couple's finances. The difficulties in which they found themselves became more dramatic and more obvious. Clara Winnicki appears to have lost all hope of salvaging something for the business. She interpreted the loss of trust on the part of the local community as persecution, a cruel blow of fate which she was powerless to control.

In 1928 Clara, who had lived in Switzerland, applied for the restoration of the Swiss citizenship which she had lost on marriage. At the same time August Herbrand, who had been living in Switzerland for many years, also applied for Swiss citizenship. The authorities appear to have treated these applications as a single joint application. They scrutinized Herbrand's financial, moral, and health imbalances and rejected the application(s). It was also noted that Clara Winnicki, despite having been born the daughter of a Swiss father, was nevertheless the child of an "eingekaufter Schweizer" - an immigrant who had acquired his citizenship not as a birth right but through payment. And it was felt that there was more about August Herbrand that was German than was Swiss. As a part of the evaluation process for the application(s) the cantonal authorities in Bern commissioned a report from the local police office in Adelboden. It is dated 29 March 1928:

- "The entire conduct and character ... of the applicant for citizenship rights August Herbrand: Apart from the current application, he has done nothing towards naturalization. The applicant is an unstable person. With his unconventional ideas, he tries not to stand out either socially or politically. It is therefore hard to judge what he thinks about our way of life and political institutions". (Note: "...die gesamte Aufführung und den Charakter ... des Bürgerrechts-Bewerbers Herbrand August: Ausser dem gegenwärtigen Gesuch, hat er für die Einbürgerung nichts getan. Der Gesuchsteller ist eine aufgeregte Person. Mit seinen besonderen Jdeen, macht er sich weder in Gesellschaft noch politisch bemerkbar. Es ist desshalb schwer zu beurteilen, was er von unserer Lebensart & politischen Jnstitutionen hält & denkt.")

It became impossible for the couple to remain in Adelboden. Difficulties with the tax office were followed by an insolvency judgement and, in October 1930, bankruptcy. Leaving behind some furniture and a considerable quantity of debts, they left the village. A final attempt to raise some cash by selling the "Pharmacie Internationale" was unsuccessful. On 11 April 1932 the Herbrand-Winnicki couple made their home in Zürich.

August Herbrand took the opportunity to advertise his presence with a line in the telephone directory identifying him as a "Dr. phil., Apotheker & Chemiker". He continued to borrow heavily, and contacted "everyone within reach for a loan". Clara initially found a job with the "Sihlfeld-Apotheke", living on the premises. She briefly recovered her confidence and railed against the "petty bourgeois view [that following marriage a woman] should return to the sainted bosom of the family [and] in accordance with the conventions of her class [become a carer] with love and sacrifice, [and] forget the profession she had learned". But Clara Winnicki, formerly proud to be Switzerland's first qualified female pharmacist and a committed self-confident campaigner for women's entry into the professions, was broken. She was unable to hold onto her job. Her sense of victimhood intensified, earning her a diagnosis of paranoia. She became institutionalized as an in-patient at the "Burghölzli", her care paid for with public funds, contributed by Zürich tax payers.

=== Expulsion and death ===
In March 1933, less than two months after the Hitler government had taken power in Germany, the city authorities moved to remove the couple's Swiss residency entitlements, based on their status as aliens and the relevant poverty laws. The minutes of a city council meeting dated 16 March 1933 quote from a letter dated 10 March 1933, received from the cantonal directorate for poor relief, in which he applies for the "repatriation" of the mentally ill Klara Emma Herbrand-Winnicki from Blumenthal (Note: There are many places called Blumenthal in Germany, but there is no other known reference to Clara Winnicki ever having been near any of them. Her father probably came originally from Silesia or Posen, however. Both regions were considered part of Prussia in Germany before 1918.) in Prussia and of her husband Dr. phil. August Herbrand who had "become a burden on state funds. The woman suffers from Paranoia and needs institutional care for an indeterminate period. The couple are completely destitute".

Clara Herbrand-Winnicki, by now seriously mentally sick, was extracted from the "Burghölzli", and on 30 August 1933 passed across to the German authorities at a Friedrichshafen frontier crossing. She died of pulmonary tuberculosis on 6 May 1941. She was buried on 9 May 1941 at the Göttingen City Cemetery.

== Appreciation ==
Although she was evidently forgotten by the time of her death, during a decade in which opinions were focused on the rising threats from fascism, Clara Winicki's pioneering achievements have subsequently attracted greater appreciation. As part of a major redevelopment project in the Inselspital (hospital and health-care complex) in Bern, six major new buildings have been planned and agreed. Work will start in 2024 of the "Clara-Winnicki-Haus" (block), which will accommodate central services and logistics provision for the entire site.
