= Annie Leuch-Reineck =

Swiss mathematician (1880-1978)

- Born: Annie Reineck; 26 November 1880; Kannawurf, Thuringia, Germany
- Died: 21 December 1978 (aged 98); Saint-Prex, Vaud, Switzerland
- Education: University of Bern
- Occupations: Mathematician; Teacher; Women's rights campaigner
- Spouse: Georg Leuch (1888 - 1959)
- Parent(s): Erhard Reineck (1841–1932); Marie Godet (1847–1936)

Annie Leuch-Reineck (born Annie Reineck: 26 November 1880 - 21 December 1978) was a Swiss mathematician and women's rights activist. She was one of the most influential participants in the Swiss women's movement during the 1920s and 1930s.

== Life ==
=== Provenance and early years ===
Annie Reineck was born in Kannawurf, a village in the countryside between Erfurt and Magdeburg in Germany. Erhard Reineck (1841–1932), her father, was a protestant church minister and superintentant (church administrator) originally from Magdeburg. Her mother, born Marie Godet (1847–1936), was from Neuchâtel in francophone western Switzerland. Annie grew up in Kannawurf and then in nearby Heldrungen. She received her early education at the home of her elder sister, Theodora (Theodora Reineck, 1874–1963). Later, between 1895 and 1898, she attended the "École Vinet", a secondary school in Lausanne. The school was headed up by her aunt, Sophie Godet.

=== Student ===
Reineck enrolled at the University of Bern in 1901 or 1902. She studied Mathematics and various Natural Sciences, notably Physics and Earth Sciences. In 1905 she received a secondary school teaching certificate. There were still very few female students at the university, and several of the members of the small "Bern Female Students' Association" ("Berner Studentinnenverein") became, in different ways, pioneering feminists and lifelong friends. For Annie Reineck these included Gertrud Woker (1878 - 1968) and the physician Ida Hoff (1880 - 1952).

=== Teacher ===
In 1907 Annie Reineck became the first German-language woman at the University of Bern to receive a doctorate in Mathematics. Her dissertation concerned "The relationship between spherical functions and Bessel functions" ("Die Verwandtschaft zwischen Kugelfunktionen und Besselschen Funktionen"). From this point till 1925 she taught at the Girls' Secondary School in Bern (where Ida Hoff was appointed school doctor in 1913) and at the city's training college for women teachers.

In 1913 she married the commercial lawyer Georg Leuch (1888 - 1959). He became a cantonal high court judge in 1920 and a Federal Supreme Court Judge in 1925, which involved relocating to Lausanne. By this time Annie Leuch-Reineck's time and energies had become divided between mathematics teaching and political campaigning: she now resigned from her teaching jobs in Bern.

=== Women's rights ===
In 1916 she took on the leadership of the Bern section of the "Swiss Association for Women's Voting Rights" ("Schweizerischer Verband für Frauenstimmrecht"). In 1919 or 1921 she was a co-founder of the "Bernese Women's League" ("Berner Frauenbund"). Between 1920 and 1933 she campaigned for the rights of Swiss women o retain their Swiss citizenship rights if they married a foreigner. She was a member of various legal commissions established by the League of Swiss Women's Associations ("Bund Schweizerischer Frauenvereine"). In 1921 she co-organised the "Second Swiss Congress for Women's Interests" ("2. Schweizer Kongresses für Fraueninteressen"), held that year in Bern. In 1928 she was appointed to the national presidency of the "Swiss Association for Women's Voting Rights" ("Schweizerischer Verband für Frauenstimmrecht"), a post she retained till 1940.

She was also, from 1928, one of those working on the 1929 "Swiss Exhibition for Women's Work" ("Schweizer Ausstellung für Frauenarbeit" / SAFFA). In 1929 she led that year's petition demanding for women the right to vote. She was a member of the national executive ("Vorstand") of the "Swiss Social Policy Union" ("Schweizer Vereinigung für Sozialpolitik") and a member of the commission set up by the Weltbund für Frauenstimmrecht ("International Alliance of Women") to enquire into the citizenship rights of wives.

== Family ==
Annie Leuch-Reineck was a grand daughter of the reformist theologian Frédéric Louis Godet (1812–1900) from Neuchâtel.

Her sister, Eva Reineck, was a professional violinist who built her career in Frankfurt am Main and married a graphic artist of Jewish provenance called David Spear. Annie Leuch-Reineck was thereby an aunt to this couple's son, Walter Eric Spear, a notable physicist who built his career in England and Scotland after the family managed to escape from Nazi Germany in 1938.
