= Rudolf Münger =

Swiss painter (1862–1929)

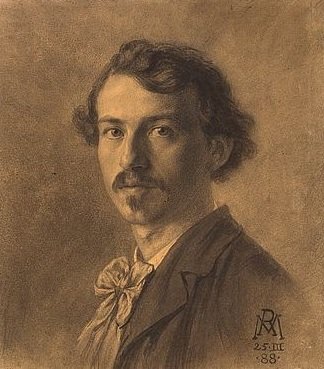
- Self-portrait, 1888
- Born: Rudolf Alfred Münger; 10 November 1862; Bern, Switzerland
- Died: 17 September 1929 (aged 66); Bern, Switzerland
- Known for: Painting, stained glass, illustration, heraldry
- Spouse: Marie Zimmermann

Rudolf Münger (10 November 1862 – 17 September 1929) was a Swiss painter, stained-glass artist, illustrator and heraldist associated mainly with Historicism. His major work was the late-19th-century fresco decoration of the Kornhauskeller in Bern.

== Biography ==
Rudolf Münger was born in Bern on 10 November 1862. He was the son of Jakob Münger, a plasterer and master painter. From 1879, Münger trained as a decorative painter in Neuchâtel. In 1881, he began studying at the Kunstschule Bern, where he received a drawing-teacher diploma in 1885.

Between 1883 and 1888, Münger continued his training in Munich, studying at the Kunstgewerbeschule and the Akademie der Künste. He then studied at the Académie Julian in Paris, but left in 1889 after becoming seriously ill. After returning to Bern, he taught decorative painting at the Handwerkerschule until 1898. He married Marie Zimmermann in 1890.

In 1899, Münger received the first federal art scholarship, which allowed him to spend five months in Paris and London. He later became involved in heritage-preservation (Heimatschutz) and traditional-costume circles, and was founding president and later an honorary member of the Bernese Heimatschutz association. Münger received an honorary doctorate from the University of Bern in 1924 and died in Bern on 17 September 1929.

== Work ==
Münger worked as a painter, stained-glass artist, illustrator and heraldist. His work included murals, historical illustrations, portraits and commissions for churches. His work is usually placed within Historicism, while some works also reflected Symbolism, Art Nouveau and Expressionism.

His principal work was the fresco programme in the Kornhauskeller in Bern, completed in the late 1890s. It brought together historical, heraldic and Bernese folk imagery with decorative and textual elements. Münger also produced stained glass for churches, heraldic glass panels and book illustrations. His stained-glass work included choir windows for the church at Wohlen bei Bern depicting a sower, a woman binding sheaves and a herdsman.

His surviving works include frescoes in the Kornhauskeller in Bern, 24 panels for the Zunfthaus at Amthausgasse 46 in Bern and works in Kunstmuseum Bern.

== Gallery ==
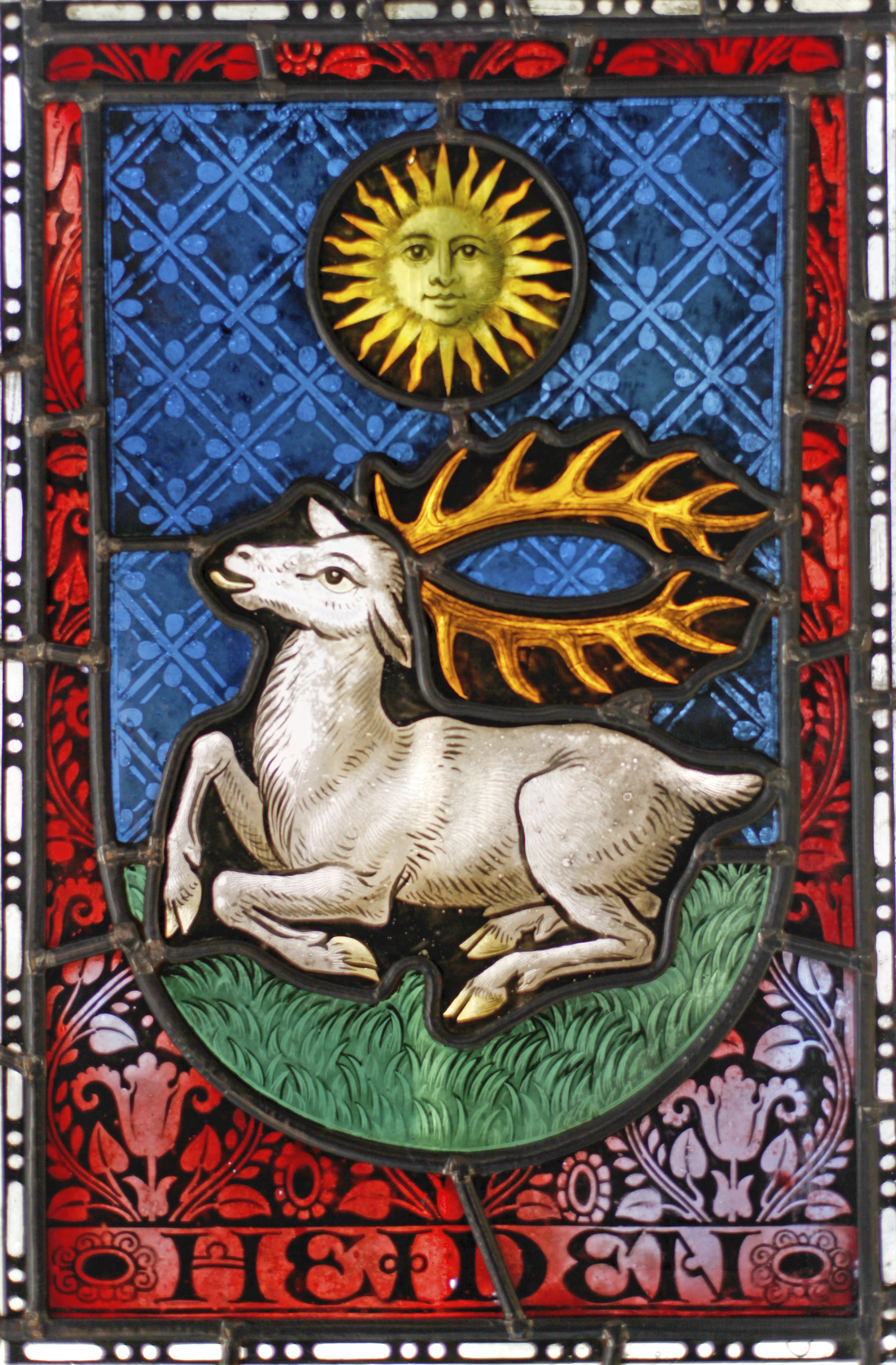
Gemeindewappen von Heiden, 1915

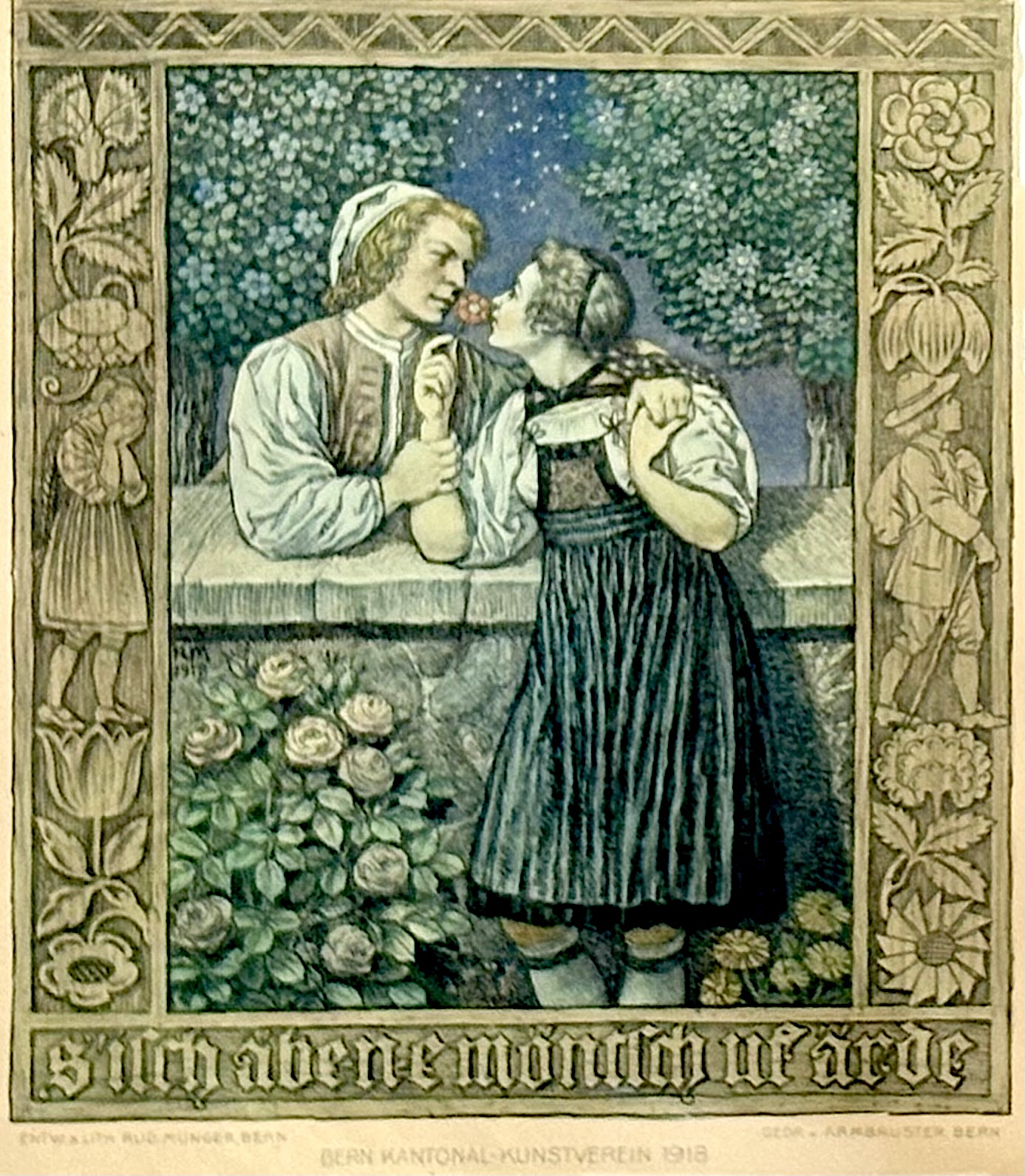
Vreneli und Hansjoggeli, 1918

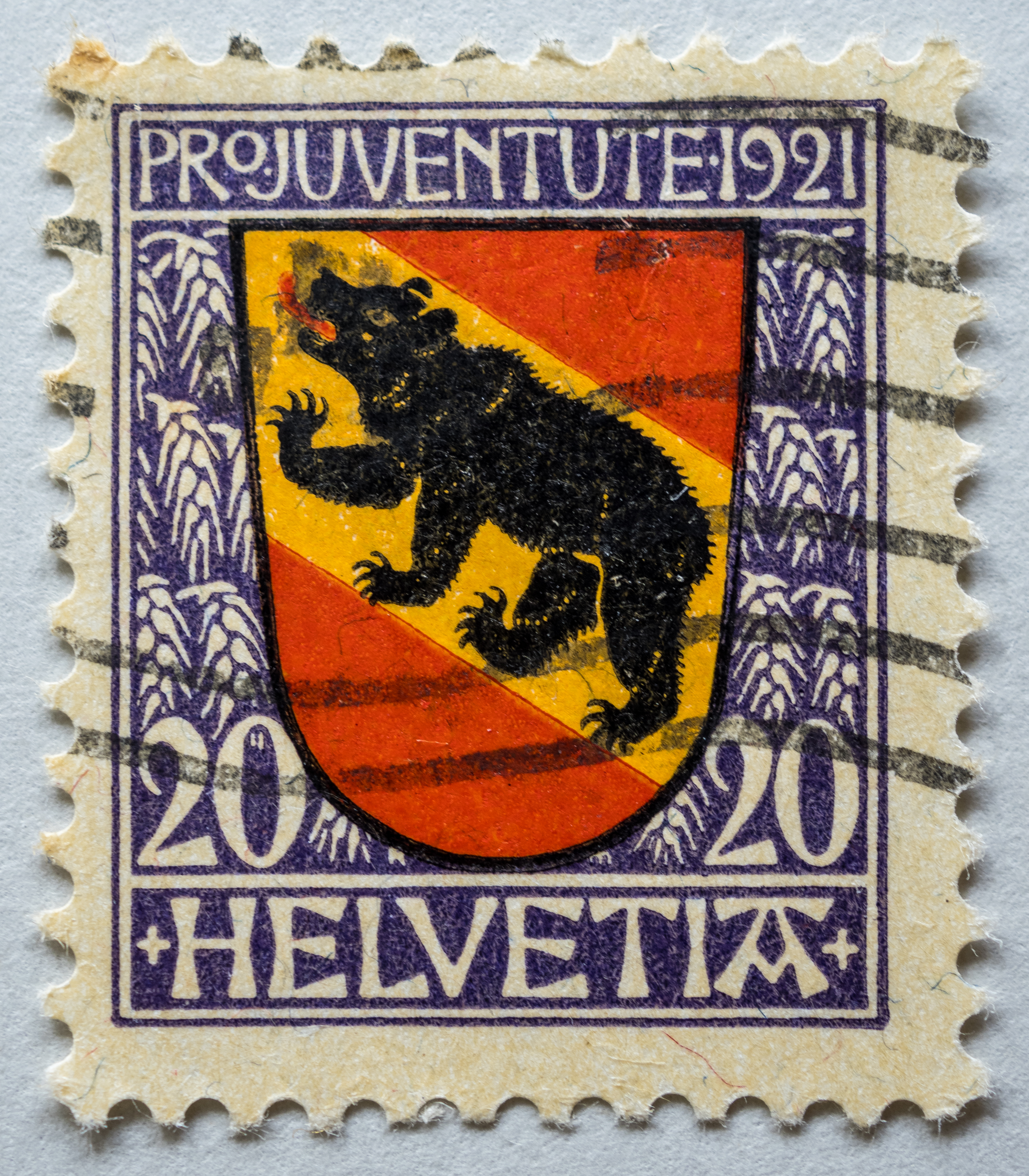
Pro Juventute stamp, 1921
