= Anna Tumarkin =

Russian-born naturalized Swiss academic

- Born: Anna-Ester Pavlovna Tumarkin; 16 February 1875; Dubrowna, Mogilev Governorate, Russian Empire
- Died: 7 August 1951 (aged 76); Gümligen, Switzerland
- Education: University of Bern
- Occupation: Academic
- Years active: 1905–1943
- Known for: First woman professor of philosophy at Bern University

Anna Tumarkin (Belarusian: Анна-Эстер Паўлаўна Тумаркін; Hebrew: אנה-אסתר פבלובנה טומרקין; 16 February 1875 – 7 August 1951) was a Russian-born, naturalized Swiss academic, who was the first woman to become a professor of philosophy at the University of Bern. She was the first woman in Europe to be allowed to examine doctoral and professorial candidates and the first woman to sit as a member of a University Senate anywhere in Europe.

== Early life ==
Anna-Ester Pavlovna Tumarkin was born on 16 February 1875 in Dubrowna, in the Mogilev Governorate of the Russian Empire to Sofia (née Gertsenshtein or Herzenstein) and Poltiel Moiseevich Tumarkin (also shown as Pavel). Her father was a Bessarabian merchant who had been granted personal nobility. As an Orthodox Jew, Pavel initially refused to allow his children to study Russian, but the children gained proficiency in both Russian and German. When she was a young child, the family relocated to Kishinev (Chișinău), capital of the Bessarabia Governorate. She attended the women's gymnasium and then attended normal school.

Wanting to attend university, but finding higher education forbidden in Russia, in 1892, Tumarkin moved to Switzerland to study at the University of Bern under Ludwig Stein. Three years later, she submitted her thesis on Johann Gottfried Herder and Immanuel Kant, which she successfully defended, and passed her examinations earning her doctorate. Around this same time, she met Anna Hoff, an older woman and friend of Dr. Stein's, who often attended the lectures he held at his home. The two became friends, making a habit of sitting together at lectures, and Hoff introduced Tumarkin to her daughter, Ida, who was five years younger than Tumarkin. Tumarkin and the younger Hoff, would later become life-long companions, though there is no evidence one way or the other to determine if their relationship was a lesbian partnership. She then moved to Berlin where she continued her studies for three years with Wilhelm Dilthey and Erich Schmidt, before returning to Bern to complete her thesis and examination for her Habilitation in 1898, becoming not only the first woman in Switzerland to complete her post-doctoral work, but the first woman in Europe.

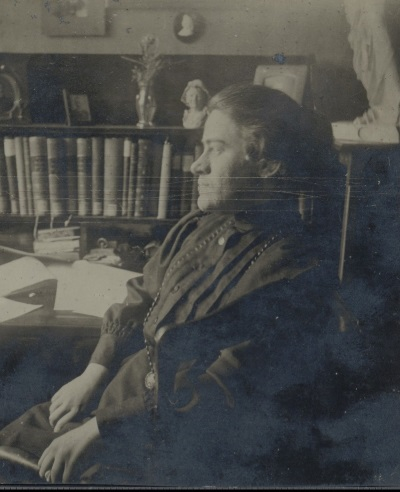
Tumarkin in 1910

== Career ==
Because there was no precedent for a woman to be appointed to the faculty of history or philosophy, a letter was sent to Albert Gobat, the Director of Education for Bern to ask if there was an objection to appointing a woman as an assistant professor. As he had no reservations, Tumarkin received the title Venia Docendi becoming a docent. By 1905, she became the first woman lecturer at the University of Bern and in 1906 became an honorary professor, another first for the University of Bern. Her lectures spanned from classic philosophers like Plato and Aristotle to more modern philosophers such as Martin Heidegger and she had a special affinity for Johann Gottfried Herder, Kant, and Baruch Spinoza. When Stein left in 1909, she took over his post, and was promoted to extraordinary professor. She was the only woman to apply for the post, among 30 candidates. Though she had adequate qualifications, the administration was unwilling to grant her the chair of the department, which instead went to Richard Herbertz. Though she performed the same duties Stein had, including lecturing, preparing professorial examinations and supervising doctoral students, Tumarkin was never granted an ordinary professorship with a department chair; however, the appointment was the first such position granted to a woman in Europe. (Note: Sofia Kovalevskaya was granted the first extraordinary professorship for a woman in Europe in 1884; however, she was not authorized to examine candidates for doctorates or professorships.) On 13 May 1910, she took her seat in the University Senate, as the first female in Switzerland or Europe to be part of the highest academic body at the university.

In 1912, Tumarkin became the roommate of Ida Hoff, who by that time had graduated from her studies and become one of the first female physicians in Bern. Hoff had opened her own practice in 1911 and recently moved to a larger house on Amthausgasse (Office-building street) to facilitate her growing practice. With room to spare, she asked Tumarkin to join her to share the accommodations. The two women were opposites in personality with Hoff being firmly grounded, practical, and a free-spirit, while Tumarkin was an abstract thinker, preferred routine, and was often engaged in seeking rational explanations for minutia. In 1918, Tumarkin's Russian passport was nullified when Chișinău became part of the Kingdom of Romania and she sought Swiss citizenship, which was granted to her in 1921. That same year, in the spring, they moved together into a new home on Hallwylstrasse, a few doors down from the Swiss National Library, filling the house with beautiful furniture and setting aside a room as their own library.

Hoff was one of the first women in Bern to own a car and the two women enjoyed taking Sunday drives to visit the various cantons of Switzerland. They also ventured further abroad, like a trip in 1925, when for the first time, Tumarkin took Hoff to visit her family in Chișinău. They also took a trip to Greece together in 1927. In the 1920s, Hoff, who was a feminist convinced Tumarkin of the advantages of women's suffrage and thereafter, Tumarkin became committed to women gaining the vote. In 1928 she participated in the first Swiss Exhibition for Women's Work (German: Schweizeische Ausstellung für Frauenarbeit (SAFFA)), representing the scientific participants. That same year, she published two papers, Ein Blick in das Geistesleben der Schweizer Frauen (A Historical Look at the Spiritual Life of Swiss Women) and Das Stimmrecht der Frauen (The Voting Rights of Women), evaluating women's place in Swiss society.

Events in her homeland during the Russian Revolution, Russian Civil War, and the rise of the Nazi Party in Germany, were deeply troubling to Tumarkin, whose family had been targeted with surveillance, and threatened with deportation. In 1937, she and Hoff made another trip to visit her family and were struck by the harsh contrast between the two visits. That same year, she was awarded the Theodor Kocher Prize from the university. Throughout the 1930s and 1940s, Tumarkin published many works which evaluated Russian culture in its historical context as well as how that had shaped Swiss society. Some of her most noted works in this context are Der Aesthetiker Johann Georg Sulzer (The Aesthetist Johann Georg Sulzer, 1933), Das Problem der Freiheit in der schweizerischen Philosophie (The Problem of Freedom in Swiss Philosophy, 1940), and Der Anteil der Schweiz an der Entwicklung der Philosophie (The Contributions of Switzerland in the Development of Philosophy, 1942). Her 1948 publication, Wesen und Werden der schweizerischen Philosophie (Being and Becoming Swiss Philosophy) evaluated the intellectual history of Huldrych Zwingli to Johann Heinrich Pestalozzi and concluded that the Swiss had developed an autonomous philosophy.

The events of The Holocaust, in which she lost many family members and friends, began to affect her health. By 1943, she was forced to retire for medical problems, when she developed elephantiasis. Hoff tried to care for her companion at home, but Tumarkin's decline continued and she became increasingly confused.

== Death and legacy ==
Six weeks after Hoff brought Tumarkin to the Siloah Deaconess House in Gümligen, Tumarkin died on 7 August 1951. Hoff's will to live was shaken by the loss of her life-long partner and she died almost exactly one year later on 4 August 1952. Tumarkin's work on her former advisor, Wilhelm Dilthey (1912), influenced the way future scholars evaluated his work, defining three phases in his development, which show how he evaluated the same problems at different times from new angles, arriving at seemingly contradictory solutions. Tumarkin described his process as "an organic development with its concentric circles: ever in a more profound and original manner".

In February 2000, next to the original building housing the University of Berne, a street, Tumarkinweg, was named in her honor. In 2014, a book honoring women pioneers Pionnières de la Suisse moderne: Des femmes qui ont vécu la liberté (Pioneers of Modern Switzerland: Women Who Lived for Freedom) was published by Editions Slatkine and included a profile on Tumarkin.
