= Centre for Development and Environment (Switzerland) =

- Established: 2009
- Director: Thomas Breu and Sabin Bieri
- Location: Bern, Switzerland
- Website: https://www.cde.unibe.ch

The Centre for Development and Environment (CDE) is an interdisciplinary research centre specializing in sustainability science and land systems at the University of Bern, Switzerland. It conducts research in many countries worldwide, with a particular focus on the Eastern Africa, Southeast Asia, South America, Europe, and Switzerland. In terms of teaching, CDE offers courses in the field of sustainable development at the bachelor’s, master’s, doctoral, and postdoctoral level.

== History ==
CDE was established in 2009 as a strategic research centre of the University of Bern, under the direction of Peter Messerli and Thomas Breu. Its origins date back to the Group for Development and Environment, founded in 1988 at the Institute of Geography of the University of Bern. This research group was headed by two professors, Hans Hurni and Urs Wiesmann, and initially based on two international research programmes, the Soil Conservation Research Programme in Ethiopia (1981–1998) and the Laikipia Research Programme in Kenya (1984–1997). Other major international research programmes followed. These included Terre Tany (1989–2000) in Madagascar, the Eastern and Southern Africa Partnership Programme (1999–2015), and programmes in Central Asia, the Mekong region, and the Andes. From 2001 to 2013, CDE was the lead institution of the National Centre of Competence in Research (NCCR) North-South, a Swiss-based international research programme on global change and sustainable development.

In 2016, UN Secretary-General Ban Ki-moon appointed the then CDE Director Peter Messerli to co-chair the independent group of scientists drafting the Global Sustainable Development Report (GSDR) 2019 on the UN Sustainable Development Goals. Peter Messerli oversaw completion of the milestone report together with co-chair Endah Murniningtyas, former Deputy Minister for Natural Resources and Environment in Indonesia.

== Research ==
CDE conducts research on sustainable development in the context of global change and related impacts on natural resources (soils, water, biodiversity), land systems, and the living conditions of different population groups. It employs researchers from the natural sciences, social sciences, human sciences, humanities, law, and economics. The four main areas of research of CDE’s interdisciplinary teams are:

- Land resources: use of natural resources (water, soil, vegetation); importance of land (access, distribution, rights) and changes and adjustments in management (cultivation techniques, conservation, commodification) for sustainable development.
- Socio-economic transitions: global change; measuring poverty and inequality; social and technological innovations in the fields of labour, production, and consumption.
- Sustainability governance: interaction of global and local regulatory systems; GIS-based methods to identify different claims to water, land, or food; policy support.
- Education for sustainable development: building competencies for transformations to sustainable development; supporting the University of Bern in implementing sustainability in teaching, research, and operations.

== Teaching ==
CDE offers a full master's in Sustainabiltiy Transformations and minors in sustainable development at the bachelor’s and master’s level, with currently over 400 students enrolled in these programmes.

The International Graduate School (IGS) North-South was created in 2009 as part of the above-mentioned NCCR North-South programme. The IGS North-South is a doctoral programme based on an inter-university agreement between the Universities of Basel, Bern, Lausanne, and Zurich, as well as selected cooperation agreements with universities in countries of the global South and East. CDE coordinates the IGS North-South, which currently has around 100 doctoral students.

== Organization ==
Administratively, CDE is part of the Faculty of Science of the University of Bern. The university’s Executive Board issues a performance mandate to CDE.

== Networks ==
CDE maintains a broad national and international network with academic institutions such as ProClim, the Swiss Commission for Research Partnerships with Developing Countries KFPE, td-net the Swiss Academic Society for Environmental Research and Ecology (SAGUF), and scnat; global scientific programmes; civil society organizations; and the public sector. It hosts

- the coordination office of the Mountain Research Initiative (MRI)
- the coordination office of the World Overview of Conservation Approaches and Technologies (WOCAT);
- the editorial office of the international peer-reviewed journal Mountain Research and Development (MRD); and
- together with Biovision, the Sustainable Development Solutions Network (SDSN) Switzerland.
