= Peter Santschi =

Marine scientist and an academic

Peter H. Santschi
- Born: Switzerland
- Occupations: Marine scientist and an academic

Academic background
- Education: B.S., Chemistry; M.S., Chemistry; Ph.D., Chemistry
- Alma mater: Gymnasium Bern; University of Bern

Academic work
- Institutions: Texas A&M University

Peter H. Santschi is a marine scientist and an academic. He is the director of the Laboratory for Oceanographic and Environmental Research, adjunct senior research scientist at the Lamont-Doherty Geological Observatory as well as a professor of oceanography and marine sciences at Texas A&M University.

Santschi is most known for his works on marine and environmental chemistry, including environmental radiochemistry. His works have been cited in academic journals, including Environmental Science & Technology, Marine Chemistry, Science of the Total Environment, and Journal of Marine Research. He was elected as a Fellow of the American Geophysical Union in 2014, and Fellow of the Geochemical Society and the European Association of Geochemistry in 2017.

== Education ==
Santschi earned his B.S. in Chemistry from Gymnasium Bern in 1963. He subsequently completed his M.S. in chemistry from the University of Bern in 1971, followed by a Ph.D. in chemistry on chemical processes in Lake Biel from the same institution in 1975.

== Career ==
Santschi began his academic career in 1968 as a lecturer in chemistry at Humboltianum Gymnasium, serving until 1970. From 1970 to 1975, he was a teaching and research assistant at the University of Bern. He then moved to Columbia University, where he was a research associate at the Lamont-Doherty Geological Observatory from 1977 to 1981, followed by a position as a senior research scientist from 1981 to 1982. From 1982 to 1988, he was a research scientist at the Swiss Federal Institute of Aquatic Science and Technology (EAWAG) and lecturer (privat docent) at ETH, while also an adjunct senior research scientist at the Lamont-Doherty Geological Observatory. Since 1988, he is a professor of oceanography and marine sciences at Texas A&M University. He was appointed a Regents Professor at Texas A&M University in 2009 and a Distinguished Professor at Texas A&M University in 2021.

From 1982 to 1988, Santschi served as the head of the Isotope Geochemistry and Radiology Section at the Swiss Federal Institute of Aquatic Science and Technology (EAWAG). Additionally, he acted as the focal area coordinator for the Center for Shelf and Coastal Oceanography at the Texas Institute of Oceanography from 1992 to 2000.

== Research ==
Santschi is an author or co-author of 400+ journal articles and 45 book chapters on these subjects, which, over the years, have received more than 30,000 citations, which made him a highly ranked scholar on ScholarGPS. His forthcoming book, coauthored by Antonietta Quigg, is entitled 'Environmental Chemistry in Service of Life. Understanding The Self-Cleansing Capacity of Aquatic Systems Through Environmental Biology and Chemistry', Springer Nature Switzerland, Open Access eBook, (2026).

Santschi's research focuses on Environmental Chemistry, Biogeochemistry, and Radiochemistry, with particular emphasis on the role of colloidally sized macromolecular organic matter, especially on the effects of microbially derived exopolymeric substances (EPS) on speciation and fate of radioactive and stable elements.

His early work investigated the distribution and removal dynamics of uranium-thorium series radionuclides in Narragansett Bay, demonstrating that particulate matter and seasonal changes significantly influence their concentrations and removal rates.

In 1984, Santschi and collaborators studied the partitioning of radioactive trace elements between seawater and particulate matter. They found that Group I elements (group A and B type metals, excluding group II) reach equilibrium rapidly, whereas Group II elements, which strongly sorb to manganese and iron oxide phases, gradually incorporate into particulate matter over 108 days, indicating complex sorption behaviors.

In 1989, together with B. Honeyman, he introduced the Brownian pumping model, explaining the slow sorption of thorium isotopes and metals in aquatic systems through colloidal coagulation with larger particles, reconciling observed laboratory and field data on the particle-concentration effect of particle-water partition coefficients and apparent kinetic constants.

His 1990 research examined physical, chemical, and biological processes at the sediment–water interface, revealing that early diagenetic transformations, driven by organic carbon and electron acceptors, significantly influence elemental cycling, with three-dimensional physical transport mechanisms playing critical roles.

Santschi’s 1995 study analyzed the distribution and fluxes of dissolved organic carbon (DOC) and colloidal organic carbon (COC) in the Gulf of Mexico and the Middle Atlantic Bight. He reported vertical gradients, conservative mixing behavior, and size-dependent partitioning.

In 2000, in collaboration with L. Guo and others, he documented improved procedures for cross-flow ultrafiltration in marine systems, finding that low molecular weight (LMW) molecules were still significantly retained while high molecular weight (HMW) molecules showed minimal permeation. They recommended high concentration factors (>40) for effective isolation of marine colloids despite challenges in retaining LMW molecules.

Further research in 1998 and 2004 highlighted the ecological significance of polymer gel particles in marine ecosystems. These gel-like particles, enriched in carbohydrates and proteins, and often exhibiting recent radiocarbon ages, play important roles in carbon cycling, sedimentation, and microbial habitats, emphasizing the need for interdisciplinary studies to understand their dynamics.

In 2008, Santschi, in collaboration with W.C. Chin, investigated the environmental behavior of engineered nanoparticles (ENPs), demonstrating that their surface properties, interactions with organic matter, and effects on biological cell walls influence their bioavailability, uptake, and toxicity in algae, plants, and fungi. Subsequent studies explored the mitigation of ENP toxicity by algae-produced EPS, highlighting the need for further research on the environmental fate and transport of ENPs.

In 2016, Santschi and collaborators, including A. Quigg and Chen Xu, reviewed the role of microbially produced EPS in the fate of oil and dispersants in marine systems, identifying key gaps in understanding EPS production under varying environmental conditions. More recently, he documented that exposure of algae and bacteria to pollutants, including nano- and microplastics, stimulates the secretion of more hydrophobic, protein-rich EPS, in response to the generation of radical oxygen species (ROS). In 2020, he proposed the protein-to-carbohydrate (P/C) ratio in EPS as a predictor of its aggregation propensity.

=== Micro- and Nano-Plastics & EPS Release (2024) ===
One of Santschi’s most recent studies (co‑authored with Wei‑Chun Chin, Antonietta Quigg, Chen Xu and others) examined how microplastics (MPs) and nanoplastics induce release of protein‑enriched microbial extracellular polymeric substances (EPS) in marine environments. This research highlights that plastic pollution not only triggers greater EPS secretion by microorganisms but shifts EPS composition toward more protein‑rich and potentially more hydrophobic forms, which can influence aggregation and particle dynamics in the ocean.

=== Uranium‑Binding Organic Matter in Wetlands (2024) ===
Santschi co‑authored a 2024 study focusing on molecular features of uranium‑binding natural organic matter in a riparian wetland using advanced ultrahigh‑resolution mass spectrometry. This work provides detailed chemical characterization of organic molecules associated with uranium in contaminated environments.

=== Hydrological Controls of Wetland Systems (2024) ===
Peter H. Santschi is a co‑author on a 2024 research article that uses stable water isotope measurements (δ²H and δ¹⁸O) and hydrodynamic modeling to examine water movement through a riparian wetland (Tims Branch watershed, South Carolina, USA). This study provides new insight into wetland hydrology and its implications for biogeochemistry.

The research involved monthly sampling of rainwater, stream water, and groundwater to measure oxygen and hydrogen stable isotopes, along with pH and oxidation–reduction potential (ORP). Hydrodynamic modeling revealed that groundwater in the hyporheic zone exchanges rapidly (on the order of weeks to a month) with stream water, and substantial groundwater exchange occurs at both gaining and losing wetland sites. Groundwater exfiltration was estimated to contribute up to ~4 % of stream water flow at the study site, with a groundwater renewal rate of about 2–4 % per day. The study also found that once the anoxic groundwater exits into stream water, it can becomes oxic, promoting the episodic formation of organic matter‑ and iron‑rich flocs through oxidation processes, which are important in biogeochemical cycling and elemental fluxes.

== Major Awards, Honors & Distinctions ==
- Fellow of the American Geophysical Union (AGU) (2014)
- Geochemistry Fellow- honored jointly by the Geochemical Society and the European Association of Geochemistry (2017)
- Member, European Union Academy of Sciences (EUAS) (2020)
- 2025 Research.com Earth Science in United States Leader Award

== Selected articles ==
- Nyffeler, Urs P; Li, Yuan-Hui; Santschi, Peter H (July 1984). "A kinetic approach to describe trace-element distribution between particles and solution in natural aquatic systems". Geochimica et Cosmochimica Acta. 48 (7): 1513–1522. Bibcode:1984GeCoA..48.1513N. doi:10.1016/0016-7037(84)90407-1.
- Honeyman, Bruce D.; Santschi, Peter H. (August 1988). "Metals in aquatic systems". Environmental Science & Technology. 22 (8): 862–871. Bibcode:1988EnST...22..862H. doi:10.1021/es00173a002. PMID 22195704.
- Santschi, Peter; Höhener, Patrick; Benoit, Gaboury; Buchholtz-ten Brink, Marilyn (January 1990). "Chemical processes at the sediment-water interface". Marine Chemistry. 30: 269–315. Bibcode:1990MarCh..30..269S. doi:10.1016/0304-4203(90)90076-O.
- Verdugo, Pedro; Alldredge, Alice L.; Azam, Farooq; Kirchman, David L.; Passow, Uta; Santschi, Peter H. (December 2004). "The oceanic gel phase: a bridge in the DOM–POM continuum". Marine Chemistry. 92 (1–4): 67–85. Bibcode:2004MarCh..92...67V. doi:10.1016/j.marchem.2004.06.017.
- Navarro, Enrique; Baun, Anders; Behra, Renata; Hartmann, Nanna B.; Filser, Juliane; Miao, Ai-Jun; Quigg, Antonietta; Santschi, Peter H.; Sigg, Laura (July 2008). "Environmental behavior and ecotoxicity of engineered nanoparticles to algae, plants, and fungi". Ecotoxicology. 17 (5): 372–386. Bibcode:2008Ecotx..17..372N. doi:10.1007/s10646-008-0214-0. hdl:20.500.11850/81653. PMID 18461442.
