= Pasqualina Perrig-Chiello =

Swiss developmental psychologist and psychotherapist

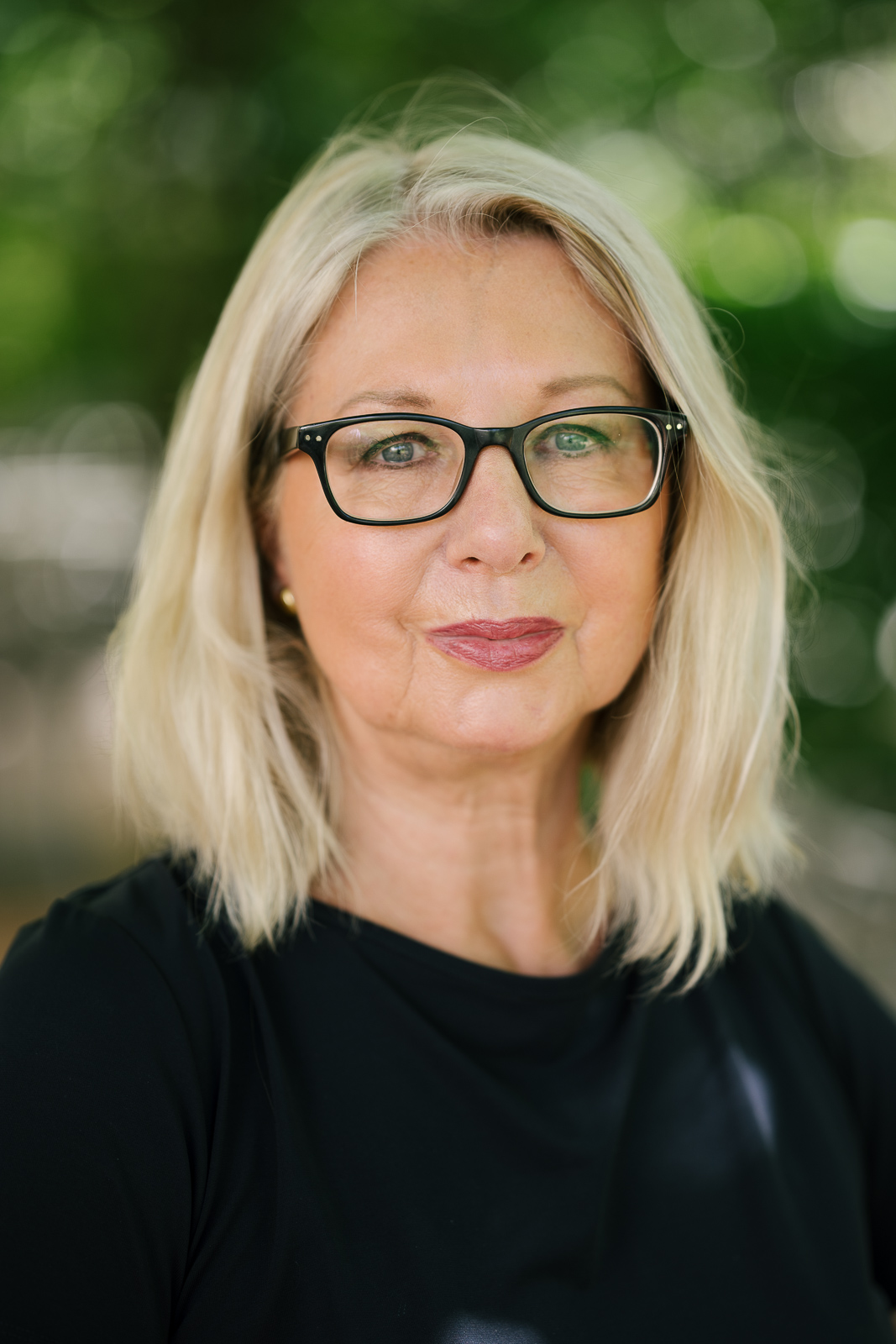
- Born: 1952 (age 73–74); Bagheria
- Education: University of Berne (Habilitation); University of Fribourg (Lic. phil, Ph.D.)
- Scientific career
- Fields: Developmental psychology of the lifespan; middle and old age.
- Workplaces: University of Berne (1996–present); University of Basel (1985-1995); Institut Universitaire Kurt Bösch (IUKB) Sion (1998-2002)

Pasqua Maria Perrig-Chiello (generally known as Pasqualina Perrig-Chiello) (born 7 October 1952, Bagheria (PA), Italy), now based in Ried-Brig, Switzerland, is a Swiss developmental psychologist and psychotherapist. She is professor emeritus at the University of Bern, specialising in lifespan developmental psychology, in particular for middle and old-aged people.

== Life ==
Perrig-Chiello came to Switzerland from Italy with her family at the age of seven and grew up in Valais. She studied special education and psychology at the University of Fribourg from 1971, where she graduated with a licentiate and earned a PhD in developmental psychology in 1981.

From 1982 to 1984 she was a visiting researcher at the University of Colorado, Boulder (Institute of Cognitive Science) and from 1984 to 1985 at Saarland University, Saarbrücken (Department of Cognitive Psychology, Johannes Engelkamp).

Thereafter she was a lecturer and researcher at the University of Basel. In parallel she completed a training program as a systemic family therapist. From 1998 to 2002, she was scientific director of the Institut Universitaire Kurt Bösch (IUKB) in Sion.

In 1996, she obtained her habilitation (venia legendi) in psychology at the University of Bern, where she was first employed as a lecturer and then from 2003 as honorary professor. Since 2016 she has been professor emeritus.

== Teaching and research ==
Her research on lifespan developmental psychology focuses on biographical transitions, vulnerability and personal growth, critical life events and the regulation of well-being, family intergenerational relationships and caregiving relatives.

Perrig-Chiello has been involved in numerous research projects as an applicant or co-applicant funded by the Swiss National Science Foundation that refer to the whole lifespan.

In her work she advocates a resource-orientated approach by emphasizing the individual's ability to shape how they cope with life transitions by considering the potential for positive change in crises. Her research aims to support people in recognizing their strengths and using them to lead a fulfilled life.

According to her own statements, she found this research focus on the second half of life by chance when she became involved in an age study. She had initially focussed on the topic of childhood and youth. The interviews with very old people made an impression on her and she realised: If you want to understand old age, you also have to analyse the middle years

Perrig-Chiello also makes her research findings available to the general public in a generally understandable form, for example in a blog post on midlife crisis as an opportunity, what it takes to be satisfied in later years and how to arm oneself against strokes of fate, or on questions of love in old age.

She has been a member of AcademiaNet since 4 November 2012, a portal for outstanding female academics and scientists, which accepts nominations based on defined criteria. The nomination was made by the Swiss National Science Foundation.

== Academic functions ==
Perrig-Chiello served as a member of the Research Council of the Swiss National Science Foundation (2003 to 2011), as well as of the Standing Committee for the Social Sciences of the European Science Foundation in Strasbourg (2004 to 2015). She was president of the Steering Committee of the National Research Programme 52 ‘Childhood, Youth and Intergenerational Relations in Societal Change’ (Swiss National Science Foundation, 2002 to 2008).

She is also committed to lifelong learning and education, acting as president of the Association of Swiss Universities for Seniors (2017 to 2022), and president of the Foundation Board of the Seniors University of Berne, where she now serves as vice president.

== Private life ==
Perrig-Chiello is married to the psychologist Walter Perrig, lives in Valais and has two grown sons.

== Selected publications ==
Her list of publications includes 79 peer-reviewed scientific articles, 29 books (monographs, editorships), 70 book contributions and numerous other scientific articles without peer review and research reports. As of October 2024, ResearchGate knows of 148 publications that have been cited 2,764 times.

=== Articles ===
- Perrig-Chiello P. (2019) Widowhood. In: Gu D., Dupre M. (eds) Encyclopedia of Gerontology and Population Aging. Springer, Cham. DOI:10.1007/978-3-319-69892-2 330-1
- Perrig-Chiello, P., Spahni, S., Höpflinger, F., Carr, D. (2016). Cohort and gender differences in psychosocial adjustment to later-life widowhood. Journals of Gerontology Series B: Psychological and Social Sciences, 71, 4, 765–774. DOI:10.1093/geronb/gbv004
- Perrig-Chiello, P., Hutchison, S., Morselli, D. (2015): Patterns of psychological adaptation to divorce after a long-term marriage.Journal of Social and Personal Relationships,32(3) 386-405. DOI:10.1177/0265407514533769
- Margelisch, K., Schneewind, K. A., Violette, J., & Perrig-Chiello, P. (2017). Marital stability, satisfaction and well-being in old age: variability and continuity in long-term continuously married older persons. Aging & mental health, 21(4), 389–398. DOI:10.1080/13607863.2015.1102197
- Perrig-Chiello, P. & Hutchison, S. (2010). Health and well-being in old age – the pertinence of a gender-mainstreaming approach in research. Gerontology, 56,2,208-213. DOI:10.1159/000235813
- Perrig-Chiello, P., Jäggi, S., Buschkühl, M., Stähelin, H.B. & Perrig, W. (2009): Personality and health in middle age as predictors for health, physical and psychological well-being in old age. European Journal of Ageing, 6:27–37. DOI: 10.1007/s10433-008-0102-8
- Perrig-Chiello, P. (2007). Mental health in public health – the necessity of a life-span perspective. International Journal of Public Health, 52,3,129-131. DOI:10.1007/s00038-007-7012-y

=== Books ===
- Her latest book is Own your Age: Stark und selbstbestimmt in der zweiten Lebenshälfte. Die Psychologie der Lebensübergänge nutzen (Own your Age: Strong and self-determined in the second half of life. Utilizing the psychology of life transitions) Beltz Verlag, Weinheim, published February 2024, 2nd edition April 2024, 3rd edition August 2024. ISBN 978-3-407-86800-8. It shows how transitions into new phases of middle and old age can be utilized as opportunities and shaped in a self-determined way. Egomaniacal self-optimization and ruthless status enhancement may satisfy us in the short term, but ultimately we are still stuck with the big questions in life, namely those of meaning, spirituality, love, participation and connectedness, and thus with the longing for a good and meaningful life.
- Perrig-Chiello, P, (2017). Wenn die Liebe nicht mehr jung ist. Warum viele langjährige Beziehungen zerbrechen und viele andere nicht. Bern: Hogrefe. ISBN 978-3-456-85587-5. (When love is no longer young. Why many long-term relationships break up and many others don't.) She interviewed 2000 people over a period of six years: 1000 late divorced and 1000 married persons. Based on this long-term Swiss study and with reference to international studies, a picture of love, relationships, sex, fidelity and crises beyond the young adult years is conveyed. Insights into how people interact with each other and what they expect from relationships provide an insight into a society in transition - and challenge people to reflect on their own relationship behaviour.
- Perrig-Chiello, P. & Höpflinger, F. (Eds.)(2012). Pflegende Angehörige älterer Menschen. Bern: Huber. ISBN 978-3-456-85035-1 (Caring relatives of older people), also Hogrefe Verlag Göttingen 2011 ISBN 978-3-456-95035-8
- Perrig-Chiello, P. (2011, 5th revised edition). In der Lebensmitte. Die Entdeckung der mittleren Lebensjahre. Zürich: NZZ libro, Verlag Neue Zürcher Zeitung. ISBN 978-3-03-823318-3 (In midlife. The discovery of the middle years of life)
