= Gabriel Valentin =

German physiologist and professor

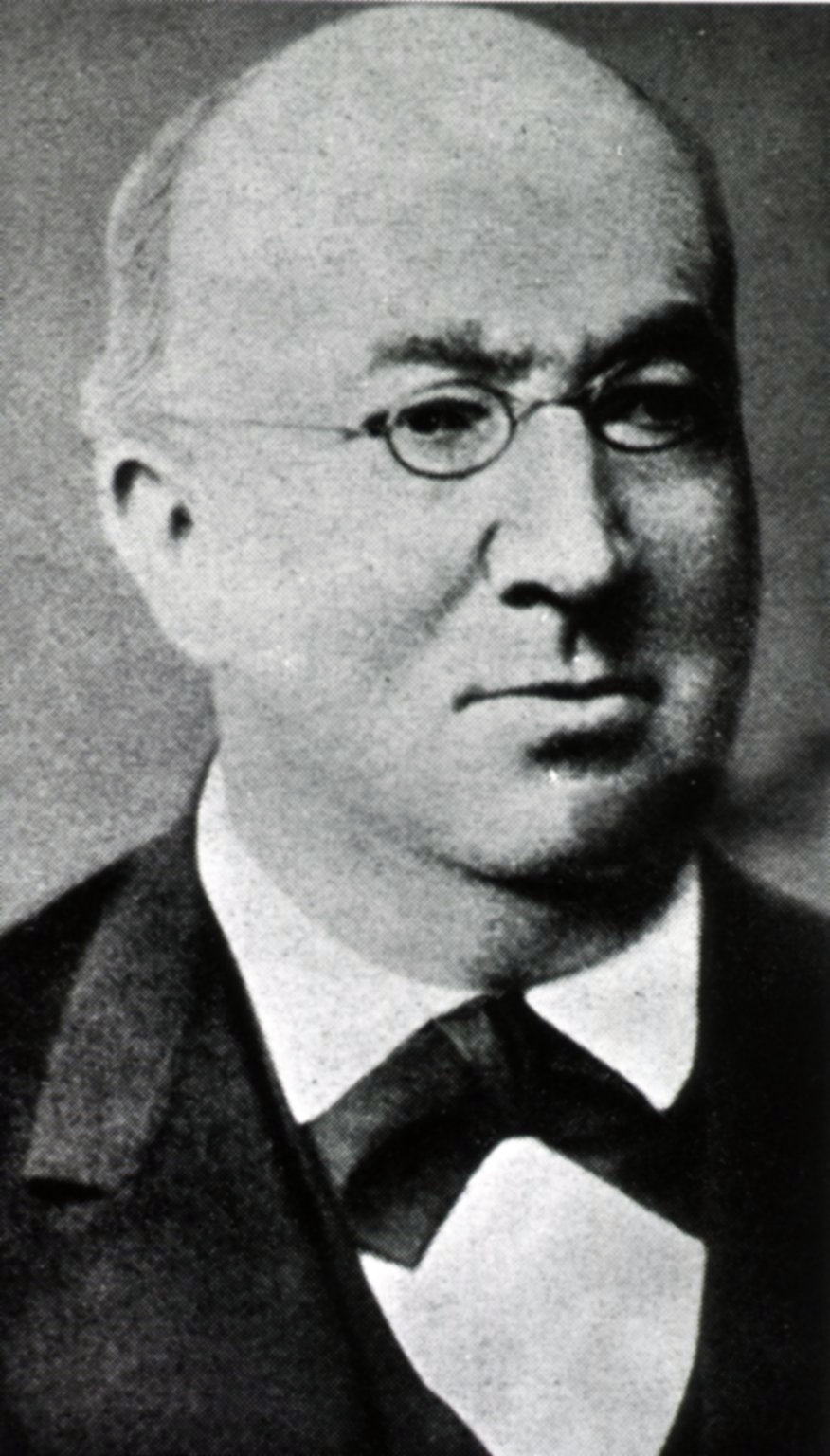
- Gabriel Valentin
- Born: July 1810; Breslau
- Died: 24 May 1883 (aged 72); Bern, Switzerland
- Education: University of Breslau
- Scientific career
- Fields: physiology
- Workplaces: University of Bern

Gabriel Gustav Valentin (July 1810 – 24 May 1883), also Gabriel Valentin, was a German physiologist and professor of physiology at the University of Bern.

Gabriel Gustav Valentin was born at Breslau in July 1810. He was Jewish, the son of a Jewish goldsmith. He was educated at the University of Breslau (with M.D. 1832), and he established himself later as a physician in the town. In 1835, Valentin received the Grand Prix of the Institut de France for his book "Histiogenia Comparata" which is a competent treatise on the evolution of animals and plants. In 1836, Valentin was elected as professor of physiology at the University of Bern, which chair he held 45 years, until he resigned in 1881.

Valentin was the author of many important works on various subjects: on the blood and its circulation, on digestion, on the electricity of muscles and nerves, on the physiology of the senses, on toxicology, etc. From 1836 to 1843, Valentin published the "Repertorium für Anatomie und Physiologie" and collaborated with others on many professional journals.

The numerous works of Gabriel Gustav Valentin include:

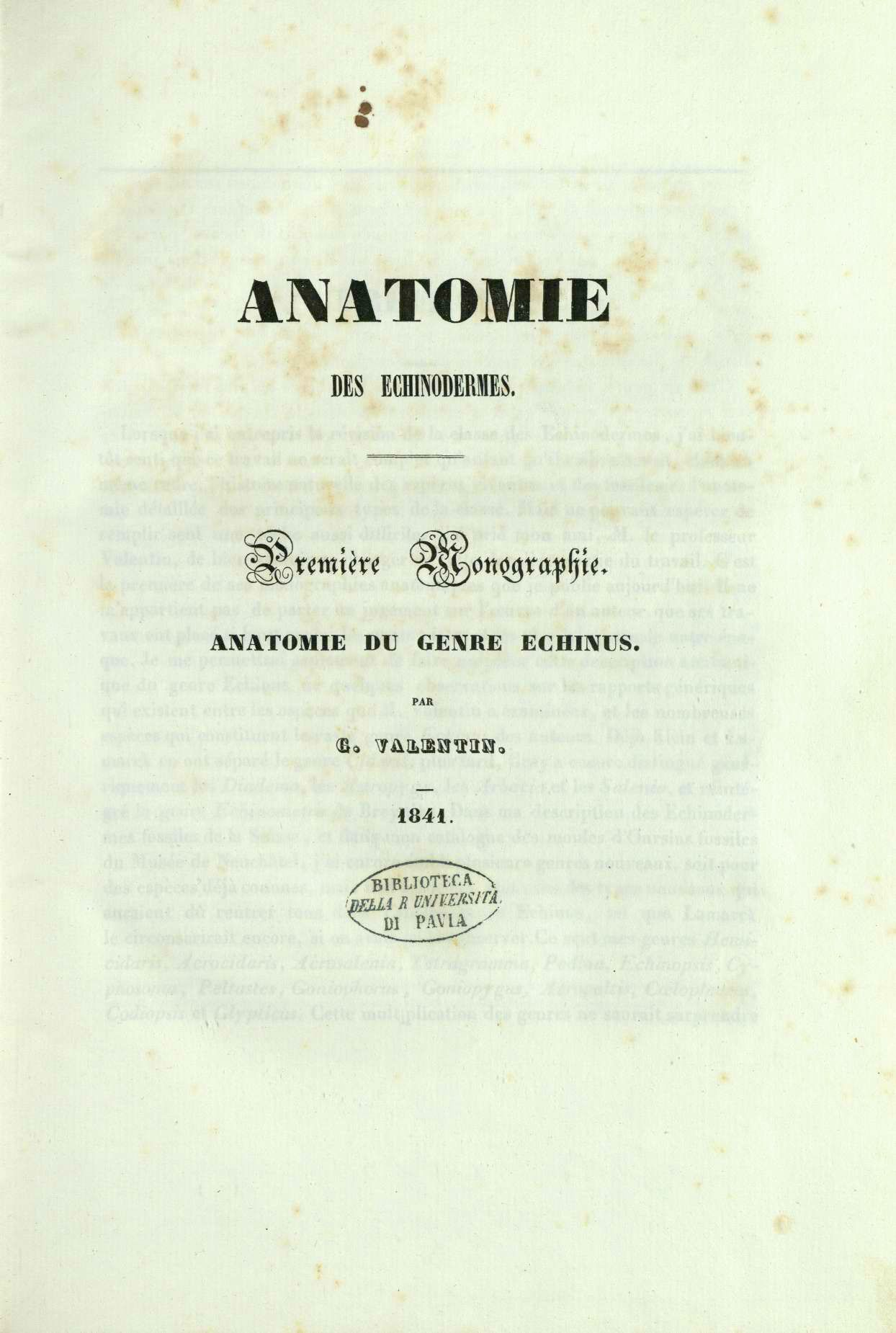
Anatomie des échinodermes, 1841

- "Handbuch der Entwicklungsgeschichte des Menschen, mit Vergleichender Rücksicht der Entwicklung der Säugethiere und Vögel" Berlin and Paris, 1835 (see above);
- "Ueber den Verlauf und die Letzten Enden der Nerven," Bonn, 1836;
- "Ueber Mechanik des Blutumlaufs," Leipzig, 1836;
- "De Functionibus Nervorum Cerebralium et Nervi Sympathici," Bern, 1839;

- Anatomie des échinodermes (in French). Neuchâtel. 1841.

- "Lehrbuch der Physiologie des Menschen," Brunswick, 1844, 2d ed. 1847-1850;
- "Grundriss der Physiologie des Menschen," ib. 1846, 4th ed. 1854;
- "Der Einfluss der Vaguslähmung auf die Lungen und Hautausdünstung," Frankfort-on-the-Main, 1857;
- "Die Untersuchung der Pflanzen- und Thiergewebe im Polarisierten Licht," Leipzig, 1861;
- "Beiträge zur Anatomie und Physiologie des Nerven- und Muskel-systems," ib. 1863;
- "Der Gebrauch des Spektroskops," ib. 1863;
- "Versuch einer Physiologischen Pathologie der Nerven," ib. 1864; and,
- "Versuch einer Physiologischen Pathologie des Bluts und der Uebrigen Körpersäfte," ib. 1866-1867.

Gabriel Gustav Valentin died at Bern, Switzerland, on May 24, 1883, at the age of seventy-two.
