= Hermann Sahli =

Hermann Sahli (May 23, 1856 – April 28, 1933) was a Swiss internist who was a native of Bern.

In 1878 he earned his doctorate from the University of Bern, and subsequently became an assistant to Ludwig Lichtheim (1845–1915) in Bern. Afterwards, he traveled to Leipzig, where he worked under Julius Friedrich Cohnheim (1839–1884) and Carl Weigert (1845–1904). He returned to Bern as an assistant at Lichtheim's policlinic, and in 1888 became a professor of internal medicine. At Bern, he also served as director of the Inselspital (medical clinic).

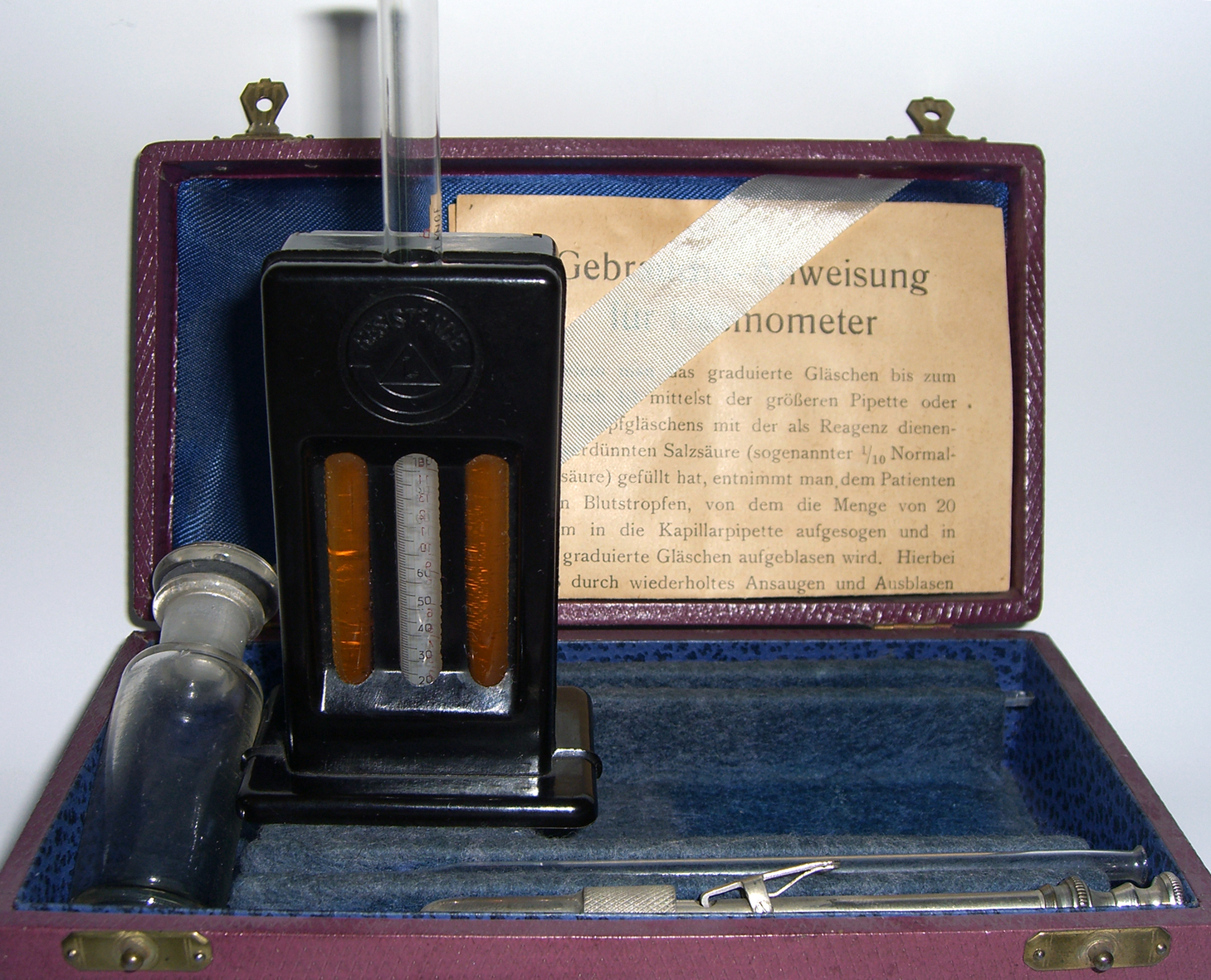
Sahli-Hämometer ca.1930

Sahli was involved in almost all aspects of internal medicine, and made contributions in the fields of neurology, physiology and hematology, being especially known for his work in hemodynamics. He made improvements to the sphygmomanometer, and introduced "Sahli's hemoglobinometer", an instrument used for colorimetric determination of the blood's hemoglobin content. His name is also associated with the "Sahli pipette method" for performing red blood cell counts, as well as the "Hayem-Sahli hemocytometer", which is a device used to find the quantity of platelets in a specified volume of blood. This device is named in conjunction with French hematologist Georges Hayem (1841–1933).

Sahli was the author of over 175 scientific articles, and in 1894 published an important book on clinical investigation methodologies called Lehrbuch der klinischen Untersuchungsmethoden. His name is associated with "2088 Sahlia", which is an asteroid that was discovered in 1976.
