= Ibrahim Abdurrahman Farajajé =

American activist, religious leader and academic

Ibrahim Abdurrahman Farajajé (19 December 1952 – 9 February 2016), formerly known as Elias Farajajé-Jones, was a queer theologian, AIDS activist, scholar, spiritual leader, academic and professor. In 2023 a festschrift entitled Dr. Ibrahim Abdurrahman Farajajé: A Legacy of Afrocentric, Decolonial, In-the-Life Theology and Bisexual Intersexional Philosophical Thought and Practice was published, edited by H. Sharif Williams.

== Early life and education ==
Farajajé was raised in Berkeley, California; his parents were both education activists. He attended boarding school, where teachers there encouraged his initial interest in Islam; it was also where, in 1966-67, that he began to identify as anti-Zionist and pro-Palestinian. As one of the first black male students at Vassar College, he earned an A.B. in Religious Studies from there in 1972. He later stated gave him a feminist education. In the late 1970s whilst studying in Switzerland, Farajajé became involved in a theatre collective involved in feminist, anarchist and queer spaces. He experienced xenophobia in Switzerland, and as a result wanted to teach at a black centre for education. In 1986, Farajajé was awarded a doctorate in theology.

== Career ==
In 1986 Farajajé began work at Howard University. In Washington, D.C., in the 1980s, Farajajé was reportedly one of the few religious scholars to be an HIV/AIDS advocate. According to Susannah Cornwall, Farajajé was also one of the first black theologians that self-identified as queer. In 1987, Farajajé was the host the co-director of a TV series for Howard University and in 1988 co-directed "Conviction: A Healing Stream", a performance that discussed black religious communities and their unwillingness to bury HIV/Aids victims. During his time at Howard University, Farajajé was faculty member for Oxala, its LGBT society.

By 1993 Farajajé was an active HIV/AIDS activist. He was active in ACT UP group and encouraged his students at Howard University to also become involved with HIV ministry. In 1995 Farajajé began work as a faculty member at Starr King School for the Ministry, where he was Provost and Professor of Cultural Studies and Islamic Studies until his death in 2016. He was known to many of his students as 'Ibrahim Baba'.

== Works ==
A proponent of the importance of intersectionality across academic fields, his work included several areas of focus, such as biphobia, bisexuality, heteropatriarchy, blackness, decolonisation, incense in Islam, amongst other interests. He was critical of biphobia in the black church, and emphasised that black religious communities had the potential to be spaces of safety for bisexual black people. According to Sofia Betancourt, he also invented the term 'organic multi religiosity' referring to how religions intersect and overlap and should not be seen as separate monolithic entities.

In 1990 Farajajé wrote In Search of Zion: The Spiritual Significance of Africa for Three Black Religious Movements; the book studies the religious and theological roots of Afrocentrism. In his 1993 essay “Breaking Silence: An In-the-Life Theology”, Farajajé wrote about ending homophobia and biphobia in society, in the “black church” and in the context of black theology.

In 2003 he co-directed the film Oceans of Mercy: African American Sufi Muslims in the San Francisco Bay Area with David Dezern. This explored the lives of African American sufis at the Masjid Al Iman mosque in Oakland and its purpose was described as the "neccessity of documentation" to make African American Muslim voices heard.

== Legacy ==
In 2023 a festschrift entitled Dr. Ibrahim Abdurrahman Farajajé: A Legacy of Afrocentric, Decolonial, In-the-Life Theology and Bisexual Intersexional Philosophical Thought and Practice was published, edited by H. Sharif Williams. Farajajé was described by Elyse Ambrose as a "ground-breaking theologian". The cookbook Queen of Months: An Eco-halal Sufi Vegan/Vegetarian Cookbook for Ramadan and Beyond was dedicated to Farajajé, and includes quotes from him alongside recipes appropriate for Ramadan.

== Selected works ==
- African Creative Expressions (1991)
- In Search of Zion: Spiritual Significance of Africa in Black Religious Movements (1990)
- 'Breaking Silence: an in-the-life theology', in Black Theology: A Documentary History Vol 2 (1992)

== Personal life ==
Politically, Farajajé described himself as an anarchist. In terms of religion, he was an ordained Santería priest, and was also a disciple of Sufism. Aubrey L. Glazer also described him as a "Sufi-Jew". He had tattoos and piercings, and was bisexual. He had both biological and adopted siblings.
