= Amthausgasse =

Street in Bern, Switzerland

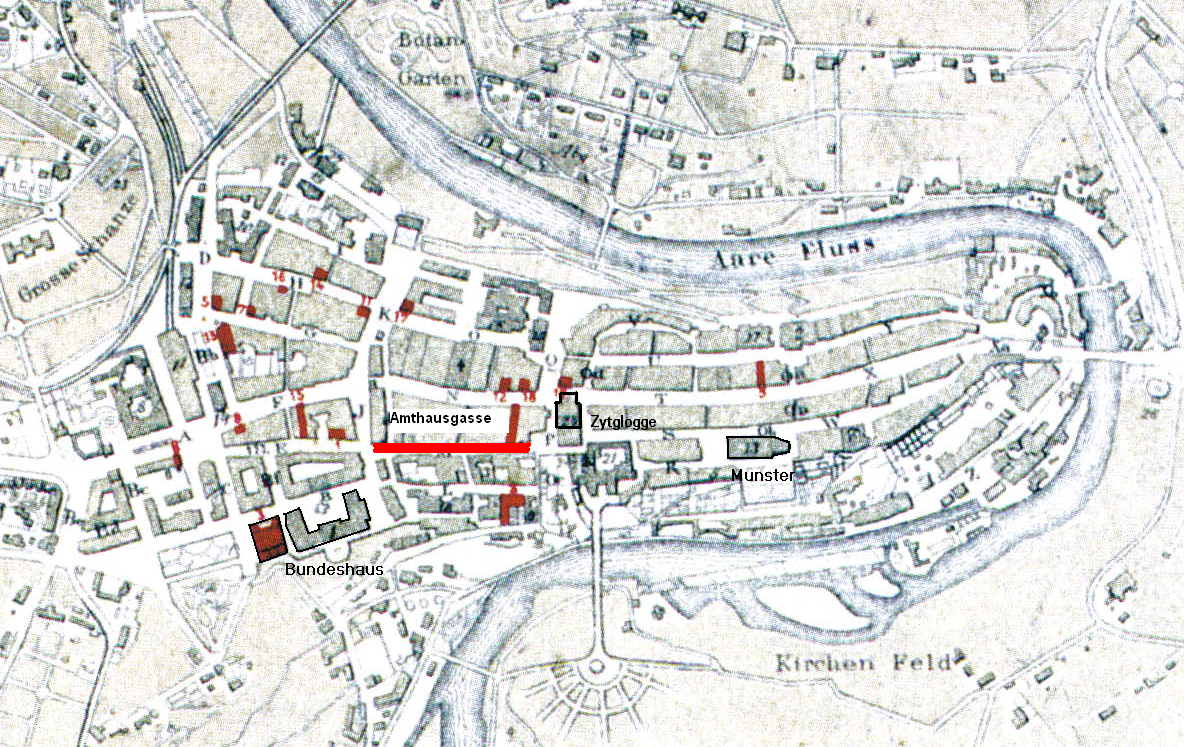
- Old City of Bern with Amthausgasse highlighted
- Length: 67 m (220 ft)
- Location: Old City of Bern, Bern, Switzerland
- Postal code: 3011
- Coordinates: 46°56′50.08″N 7°26′48.71″E

The Amthausgasse is one of the streets in the Old City of Bern, the medieval city center of Bern, Switzerland. It is part of the Innere Neustadt which was built during the expansion of 1255 to 1260.

One building, a Burgher house at Amthausgasse 5 is listed on the Swiss inventory of heritage site of national significance and it is part of the UNESCO Cultural World Heritage Site that encompasses the Old City.

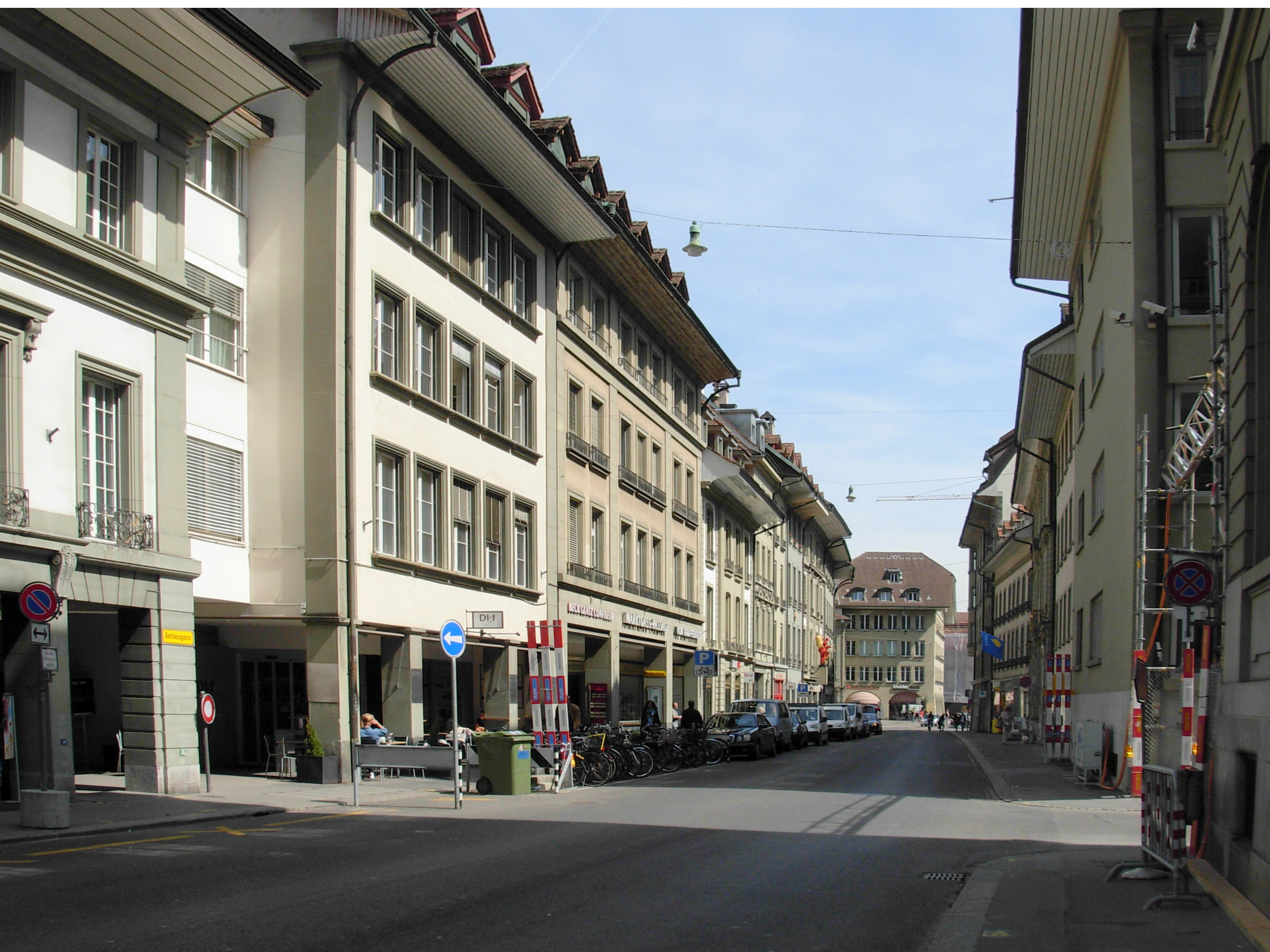
Amthausgasse
