= University of Bern =

University in the Swiss capital of Bern

Coordinates: 46.950519°N 7.438109°E

- Universität Bern
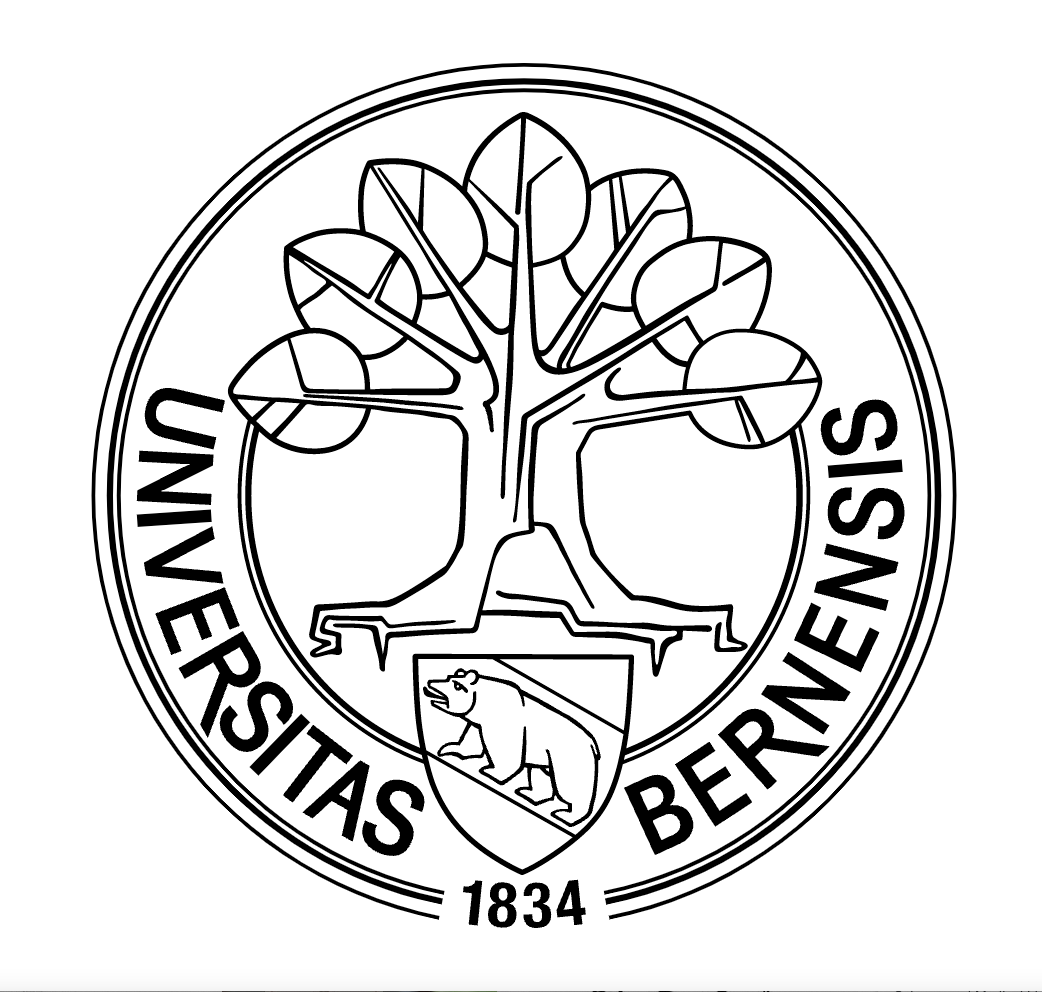
- Latin: Universitas Bernensis
- Type: Public (cantonal)
- Established: 1834; 192 years ago
- Affiliations: Guild of European Research-Intensive Universities, swissuniversities
- Budget: CHF 939 million (third-party funds: CHF 367 million)
- Rector: Christian Leumann
- Academic staff: 529 professors
- Administrative staff: 1,874
- Students: 19,608
- Location: Hochschulstrasse 6, Bern, Canton of Bern, 3012, Switzerland
- Campus: Urban
- Colours: White; Red; Blue
- Website: unibe.ch

The University of Bern (German: Universität Bern; French: Université de Berne; Latin: Universitas Bernensis) is a public research university in the Swiss capital of Bern. It was founded in 1834. It is regulated and financed by the canton of Bern. It is a comprehensive university offering a broad choice of courses and programs in eight faculties and some 150 institutes. With around 19,000 students, the University of Bern is the third largest university in Switzerland.

== Organization ==
The University of Bern operates at three levels: university, faculties and institutes. Other organizational units include interfaculty and general university units. The university's highest governing body is the Senate, which is responsible for issuing statutes, rules and regulations. Directly answerable to the Senate is the University Board of Directors, the governing body for university management and coordination. The board comprises the rector, the vice-rectors and the administrative director. The structures and functions of the University Board of Directors and the other organizational units are regulated by the Universities Act.

The University of Bern had 19,608 students in 2024. Of these, 41 percent (8,071) were registered in bachelor programs and 25 percent (4,992) in master's programs, 18 percent (3,518) were doctoral students, and another 15 percent (3,027) were enrolled in continuing education programs. There were 1,667 bachelor's degree graduation, 1,603 master's degree graduations and 725 PhD student graduations in 2021. For some time now, the university has had more female than male students. At the end of 2024, women accounted for 60% of students.

Academic year	Students
2014/2015	17,428
2015/2016	17,430
2016/2017	17,514
2017/2018	17,882
2018/2019	18,019
2019/2020	18,576
2020/2021	19,230
2021/2022	19,441
2022/2023	19,297
2023/2024	19,640
2024/2025	19,608

== Location ==
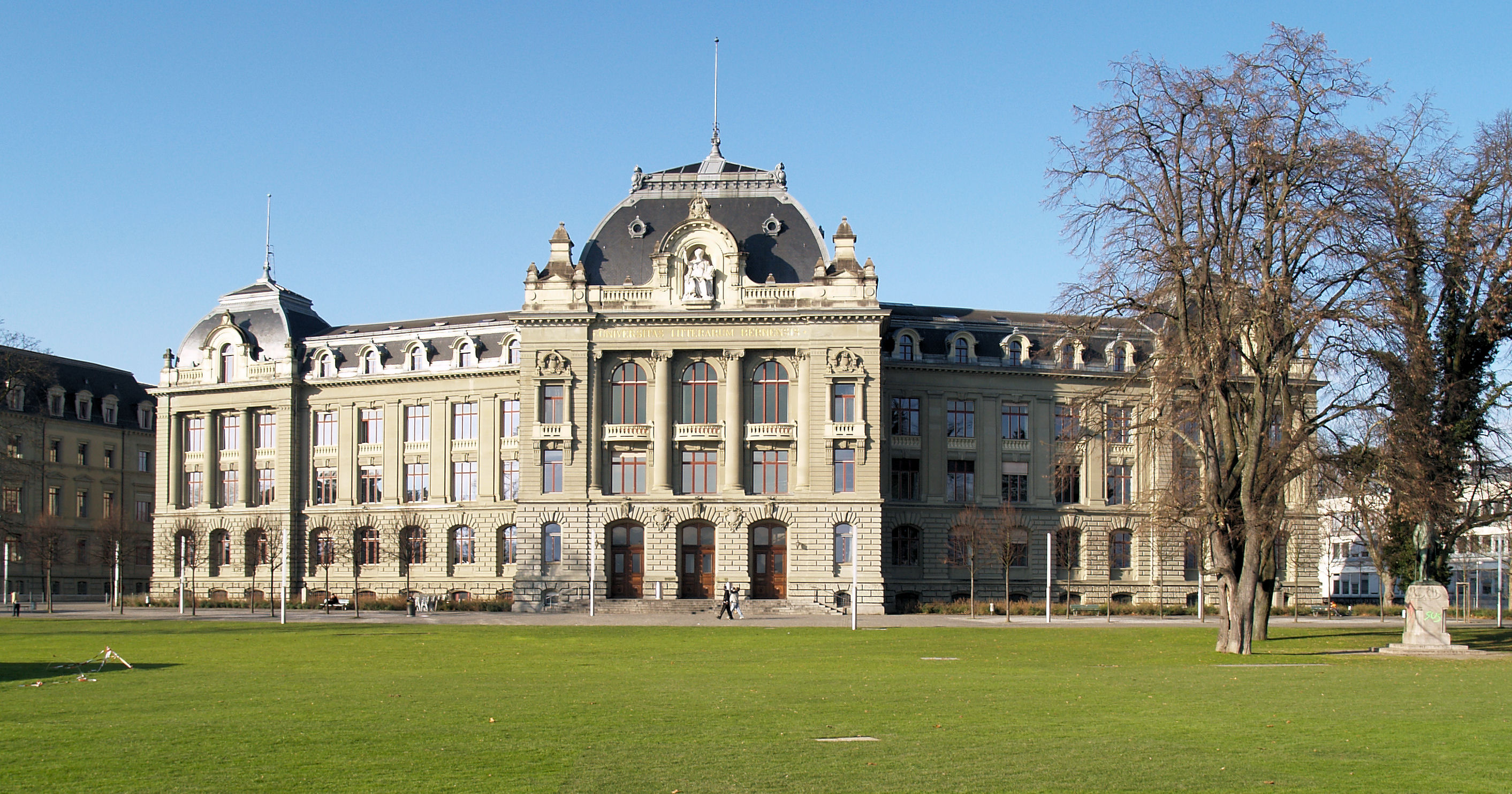
Main building of the University of Bern

The University of Bern does not have a single large campus on the edge of the city, but has consistently pursued the principle of a university in the city. Most institutes and clinics are still in the Länggasse, the traditional university district adjoining the city centre, within walking distance of one another. The Faculty of Theology and various institutes in the Faculty of Humanities are now housed in an old chocolate factory (the Unitobler), and in 2005 the former women's hospital was refurbished to serve as a university centre for institutes in the Faculty of Law and Department of Economics (the UniS). The vonRoll site, another former factory building, is in the process of being refurbished to house the Faculty of Human Sciences and the Department of Social Sciences.

== History ==
=== Early history: Collegiate school and academy (1500–1834) ===
The roots of the University of Bern go back to the sixteenth century, when a collegiate school was needed to train new pastors after the Reformation. As part of its reorganization of higher education, the government of Bern transformed the existing theological college into an academy with four faculties in 1805. Henceforth, it was possible to study not only theology in Bern, but also law and medicine.

=== The old university: New beginning and development (1834–1900) ===
As in other countries of Europe, nineteenth-century politics in Switzerland were dominated by the struggle between conservative and liberal currents. The liberals gained control of the Canton of Bern in 1831 and in 1834 turned the academy into a university, with an academic staff of 45 to teach 167 students. Owing to the political situation, it was not until the promulgation of the federal constitution in 1848 that the university was able to embark on a period of peaceful development. Between 1885 and 1900, the number of students doubled from 500 to 1,000. As a result, at the turn of the twentieth century the University of Bern was the largest university in Switzerland. This rapid growth reflected the university's attraction for foreign students, in particular Germans and Russians, who accounted for half of the total enrollment. It was also Russian female students who in the 1870s won the right for women to study.

=== The new university: New building and consolidation (1900–1950) ===
With the growing prosperity of the city of Bern, the university in the Länggasse quarter expanded at the end of the 19th century. In 1903, a new Main Building was inaugurated on the Grosse Schanze and the number of faculties increased. In 1908–09, three prominent persons put the University of Bern in the limelight. In 1908, Albert Einstein taught the first of three semesters of theoretical physics. The following year, Anna Tumarkin, a Russian philosopher, was appointed to an extraordinary professorship and thus became the first female professor at a European university entitled to examine doctoral and post-doctoral theses. Also in 1909, Theodor Kocher, a Bernese surgeon, was awarded the Nobel Prize in Medicine. In the following years the university consolidated its position as a small centre of higher learning with a stable enrollment of about 2,000 students.

=== The modern university: Expansion and reorganization (1950–2000) ===
After World War II, a growing number of voices called for the expansion of tertiary education in Switzerland. The rapid growth in the 1950s and 1960s (enrollment at the University of Bern had already reached 5,000 in 1968) – generated pressure for expansion. The completely revised University Act of 1996 transformed the University of Bern from an administrative division of the Department of Education of the Canton of Bern into an autonomous institution. a legal entity in its own right. The Act clearly defined the competencies of the university and of the state. The university passed another milestone in 1992, when its enrollment reached 10,000.

=== The university today: Bologna Reform and restructuring (since 2000) ===
The Bologna Declaration ushered in the era of ECTS credits and the bachelor's and master's degree structure. The university set strategic research priorities, such as climate research, and promoted inter-university cooperation. At the same time, the university reorganized its faculties. With the amendment to the University Act in summer 2010, the University Board of Directors acquired the right to choose its own ordinary professors and keep its own accounts separate from the state.

The University Board of Directors formulated a strategy in 2013, which builds on the previous strategy of 2006, the 2012 mission statement, and the performance mandate for the university from the Cantonal Government.

== Structure ==
=== Faculties ===
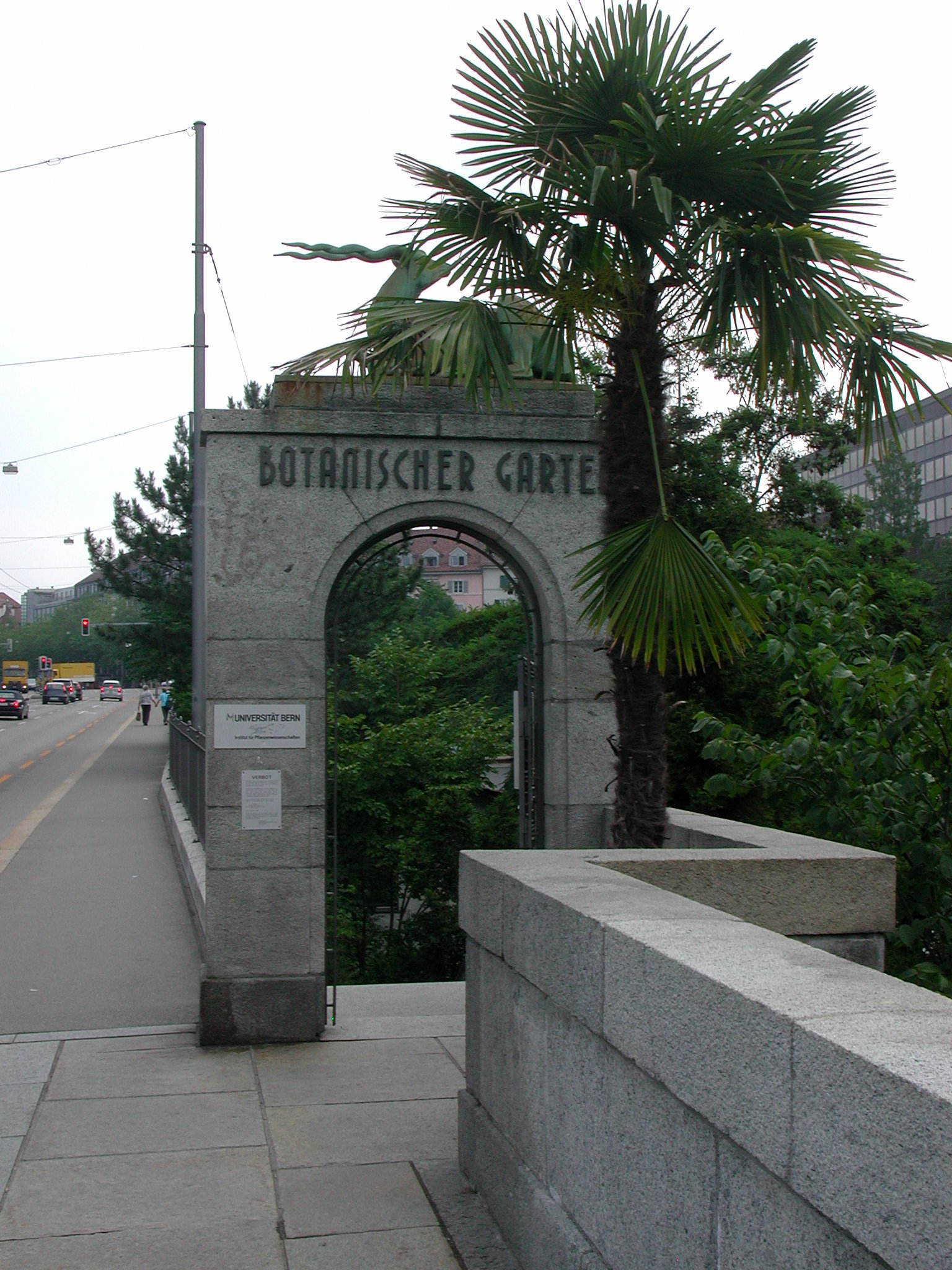
Entrance to the Botanic Garden

The University of Bern has eight faculties:

- Theology
- Law
- Business, Economics and Social Sciences
- Medicine
- Veterinary Medicine (Vetsuisse)
- Humanities
- Science
- Human Sciences

The medical faculties of the Universities of Bern and Basel have formed a strategic alliance in the fields of cardiac surgery, neurosurgery, pathology and microbiology. The Vetsuisse Faculty was created in 2006 through the merger of the Faculties of veterinary medicine of the Universities of Bern and Zurich. The Humanities Faculty is comparable to the arts and sciences departments of American universities and offers majors in the three areas of art and culture, archaeology and history, and languages and literature. The Faculty of Science focuses on the natural and life sciences. The Human Sciences Faculty was founded in 2005 and offers study programmes in education, sports and psychology.

=== Academic programs ===
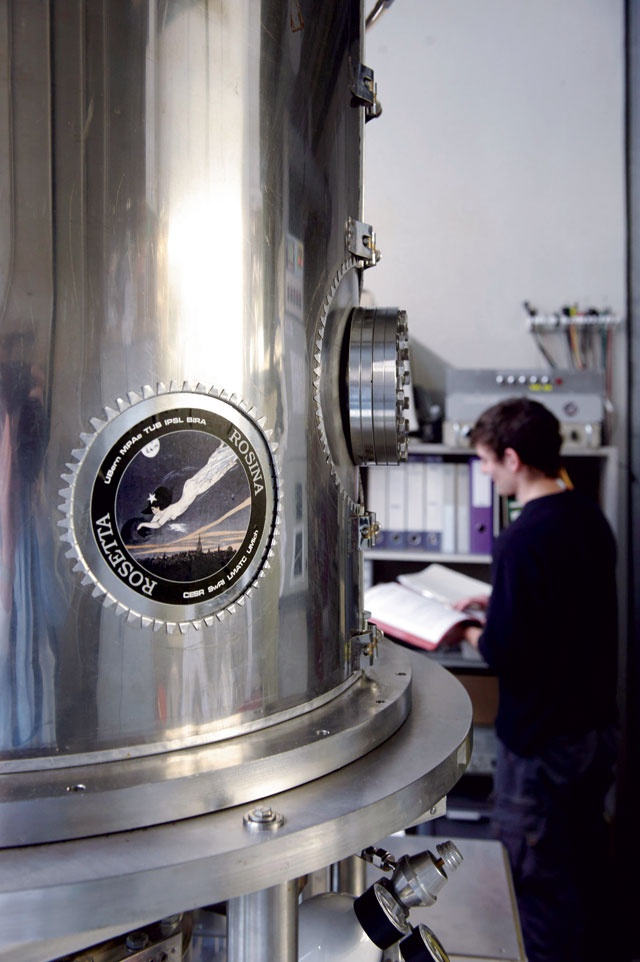
Steel container for the Rosetta mission of the ESA, 2009.

As a comprehensive university, Bern covers a wide range of classical university courses in some 39 bachelor, 71 master and 69 advanced study programs. The Physics Institute contributed to the first flight to the Moon and still carries out experiments and provides apparatus for NASA and ESA space missions on a regular basis.

In addition to the classical disciplines, the University of Bern has also established programmes in newer ones such as sports science and theatre studies. It is the only institution in Switzerland with a theatre studies course that enables students to major in dance in their master program. The University of Bern also offers the Master in Applied Economic Analysis (MAEA), which is the only university-level program in Switzerland with focus on applied economic analysis. The Graduate Schools for doctoral candidates offer further-reaching programmes that are closely linked to the university's research priorities in the fields of climate science, health care and penal law and criminology.

=== General university institutions ===
There are six centres with specialized roles and interfaculty units maintained by the University of Bern:

- Collegium generale (CG)
- Walter Benjamin Kolleg (WBKolleg)
- Interdisciplinary Centre for Gender Studies (ICFG)
- Microscopy Imaging Center (MIC)
- Experimental Animal Center (EAC)
- Centre for Continuing University Education (Zentrum für universitäre Weiterbildung, ZUW)

The function of these general university institutions is to promote dialogue between students in different disciplines and faculties through interdisciplinary events for academic staff and students. The Centre for Continuing University Education (ZUW) focuses on scientific further education. The selection of topics in the ZUW programmes ranges from public administration through dentistry to spiritual guidance. In addition, the University of Bern has also taken the lead in the German-speaking world in creating a number of novel study programmes, for instance Evaluation.

=== Interdisciplinary centres ===
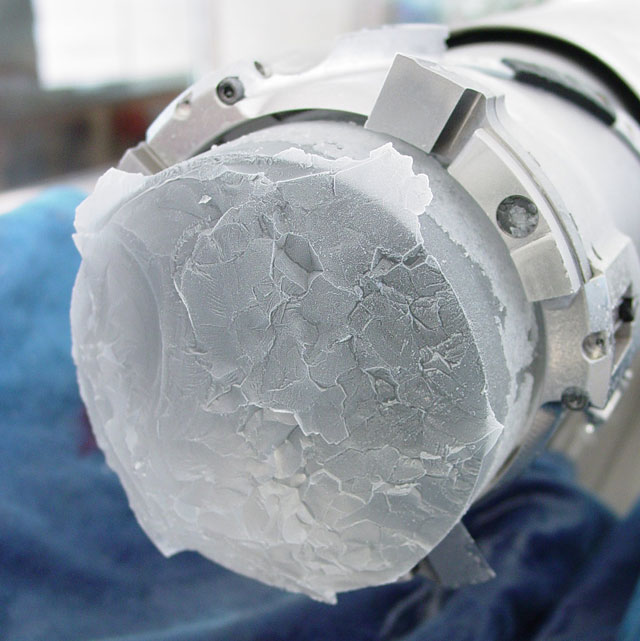
Ice core of the OCCR for climate reconstruction, 2006

The university has defined specific strategic focuses of research and established interdisciplinary centres for research and teaching. The biomedical engineering programmes of the Artificial Organ (ARTORG) Center for Biomedical Engineering Research and the Public Management and Policy programme of the Center of Competence for Public Management (CCPM).

There are 10 strategic centres and interfaculty units at the University of Bern:

- Albert Einstein Center for Fundamental Physics (AEC)
- ARTORG Center for Biomedical Engineering Research
- Bern Center for Precision Medicine (BCPM)
- Centre for Development and Environment (CDE)
- Center for Regional Economic Development (CRED)
- Center for Space and Habitability (CSH)
- Center of Competence for Public Management (KPM)
- Multidisciplinary Center for Infectious Diseases (MCID)
- Oeschger Centre for Climate Change Research (OCCR)
- World Trade Institute (WTI)

A number of the university's centres focus on the challenges of sustainability. The Centre for Development and Environment (CDE) manages research programmes in the field of sustainable development, focusing on its particular areas of expertise in integrated regional development and natural resource management. The World Trade Institute (WTI) manages research, education, and outreach focused on global economic governance, including global sustainability policy. The Oeschger Centre for Climate Change Research (OCCR) is at the forefront of international research on climate science and policy, and its researchers have participated as co-chair, coordinating lead authors or lead authors in all the assessment reports so far published by the IPCC.

The Center for Regional Economic Development (CRED) is an interfaculty center for research, teaching and consulting in regional economic development. Researchers from the research units Economics, Entrepreneurship, Geography and Tourism deal with research questions regarding the following research areas: Location dynamics and regional economic policy, Tourism as well as Land use policy and real estate.

The Center for Space and Habitability (CSH) leads the European CHEOPS (CHaracterising ExOPlanets Satellite) project. CHEOPS is a planned European space telescope for the study of the formation of extrasolar planets, with a launch window in October to November 2019.

Several of the centers offer specialized graduate programmes. For example: the biomedical engineering programmes of the Artificial Organ (ARTORG) Center for Biomedical Engineering Research; the Public Management and Policy programme of the Center of Competence for Public Management (CCPM); the WTI (offering MAS, LLM, and PhD programs in international economics and economic law); and the OCCR graduate school (offersing an MSc and a PhD program in Climate Sciences, as well as a Swiss Climate Summer School).

== Bern Open Publishing ==
Bern Open Publishing (BOP) is the University Library of Bern’s Institutional Publishing Service Provider (IPSP). It hosts peer-reviewed diamond open access journals and books. Bern Open Publishing is an operating member of Diamond Open Access CH (DOACH), which is the National Capacity Center of the European Diamond Capacity Hub (EDCH).

== Rankings ==
University rankings

Global – Overall
- ARWU World: 101–150 (2024)
- QS World: =184 (2026)
- THE World: =116 (2024)
- USNWR Global: 111 (2024-25)

The University of Bern has been ranked as one of the top 150 universities in the world. In the QS World University Rankings 2023, it ranked 120th. The Shanghai Ranking (ARWU) 2022 ranked the University of Bern in the range 101st–150th in the world. In the Leiden Ranking 2021, it ranked 180th in the world. In the Times Higher Education World University Rankings it ranked 94th in 2023.

== Notable people ==
=== Faculty ===
A number of professors at the University of Bern were pioneers in their field. The Russian-born Anna Tumarkin was the first female professor in Europe with the right to examine doctoral and post-doctoral students. The physician Gabriel Gustav Valentin was the first Jewish professor to be elected to a chair at a German-speaking university. Theodor Oskar Rubeli was co-responsible for founding the first faculty of veterinary medicine in the world. Finally, the ice core analyses of physicist Hans Oeschger played a pioneering role in the development of climate research. Other notable academics at the University of Bern include (by faculty):

Theology

Eduard Herzog, Ulrich Luz, Adolf Schlatter, Lukas Vischer, Eduard Zeller

Law

Carl Hilty, Eugen Huber

Medicine

Jakob Klaesi, Emil Theodor Kocher, Hugo Kronecker, Theodor Langhans, Ludwig Lichtheim, Maurice Edmond Müller, Fritz de Quervain, Hermann Sahli, Gabriel Gustav Valentin, Esther Fischer-Homberger

Humanities

Andreas Alföldi, Elisabeth Ettlinger, Carl Heinrich Wilhelm Hagen, Walther Killy, Julius Pokorny, Ignaz Paul Vitalis Troxler, Anna Tumarkin, Hermann Usener, George van Driem

Natural sciences

Albert Einstein, Heinrich Greinacher, Hans Oeschger, Pasqualina Perrig-Chiello, Ludwig Schläfli, Bernhard Studer, Hugo von Mohl, Heinrich von Wild, Hugo Hadwiger

Economics

Alfred Amonn, Max Weber

Others

Theodor Oskar Rubeli, Sylvie Graf

=== Alumni ===
The following prominent persons studied at the University of Bern:

- Karl Barth – theologian and a twentieth-century Father of the Church
- Carl Baudenbacher – lawyer and President of the EFTA Court
- Georg von Békésy – biophysicist, Nobel Prize in Physiology or Medicine 1961
- Walter Benjamin – philosopher and literary critic
- Richard Bing – cardiologist and composer
- Hans Bloesch – writer, correspondent, editor, librarian
- Hans Blum – writer and lawyer
- John le Carré – writer
- Thierry Carrel – heart surgeon
- Andreas Dorschel – philosopher
- Friedrich Dürrenmatt – writer
- Matthias Egger – physician and epidemiologist, president SNSF research council
- Ibrahim Abdurrahman Farajajé – theologian, educator, HIV/AIDS activist, bisexual activist, Sufi Shaykh
- René Fasel – President of the International Ice Hockey Federation and Member of the International Olympic Committee
- Selma Feldbach – first Estonian woman to become a medical doctor
- Markus Feldmann – politician and federal councillor
- Tamara Funiciello – women's rights activist and politician
- Niklaus Gerber – chemist and Swiss dairy industry pioneer
- Charles Albert Gobat – Nobel Peace Prize 1902
- Jeremias Gotthelf – novelist and pastor
- Rudolf Gnägi – politician and federal councillor
- Emma Graf – historian, teacher, suffragist
- Lazar Grünhut – rabbi and writer, Zionist activist
- Thomas Jordan – chairman of the Swiss National Bank
- Yehezkel Kaufmann – philosopher and theologian
- Rosa Kerschbaumer-Putjata, Russian ophthalmologist and Austria's first female doctor
- Fritz Klein – psychiatrist and sex researcher
- Daniel Koch (born 1955) – physician
- Emil Theodor Kocher – physician and medical researcher, Nobel Prize in Physiology or Medicine 1909
- Leopold Koss – cytopathologist
- Peter Lampe – theologian and professor
- Adolfo Lutz – specialist in tropical medicine and epidemiologist
- Mani Matter – singer-songwriter and lawyer
- Kurt Marti – theologian, poet and writer
- Eduard Müller – politician and federal councillor
- Werner Munzinger – Africa explorer
- Hassan Naim - Lebanese-Swiss biochemist
- Ulrich Ochsenbein – federal councillor and general, founding member of the Swiss Confederation
- Edith Pechey – physician and campaigner for women's rights
- Rolf Reber – psychologist and professor
- Olga Roh – founder of Rohmir
- Regula Rytz – politician, sociologist and historian
- Peter Santschi – marine scientist and academic
- Karl Schenk – politician and, in office for 31 years, longest-serving federal councillor
- Karl Scheurer – politician and federal councillor
- Samuel Schmid – politician and federal councillor
- Nikolaus Senn – former co-director of Schweizerische Bankgesellschaft
- Jakob Stämpfli – politician and federal councillor, lawyer and journalist
- Hans Martin Sutermeister – physician, politician and free-thinker
- Daniel Vasella – chairman and CEO of Novartis
- Nikolaj Velimirović – Serbian Orthodox bishop and saint
- Carl Vogt – scientist and politician
- Flavia Wasserfallen – politician
- Kurt Wüthrich – chemist, winner of Nobel Prize in Chemistry 2002
- Ursula Wyss – economist and politician
- Jean Ziegler – sociologist, politician and writer
- Thomas Zurbuchen – astrophysicist, Associate Administrator for the Science Mission Directorate at NASA
- Andreas Zünd – judge at the European Court of Human Rights

=== Researchers ===
- Sir Paul Nurse – Nobel Prize in Physiology or Medicine 2001

== See also ==
- List of largest universities by enrollment in Switzerland
- List of modern universities in Europe (1801–1945)
- List of universities in Switzerland

== Bibliography ==
- Im Hof, Ulrich et al. (ed.). Hochschulgeschichte Berns 1528–1984. Zur 150-Jahr-Feier der Universität Bern 1984. Bern: Universität Bern, 1984.
- Im Hof, Ulrich et al. (ed.). Die Dozenten der bernischen Hochschule. Ergänzungsband zu: Hochschulgeschichte Berns 1528–1984. Bern: Universität Bern, 1984.
- Rogger, Franziska. "Die Universität Bern und ihre gesammelte(n) Geschichte(n)", UniPress, 139 (December 2008), pp. 12–31.
- Rogger, Franziska, and Bankowski, Monika. Ganz Europa blickt auf uns! Das schweizerische Frauenstudium und seine russischen Pionierinnen. Baden: Hier + jetzt Verlag für Kultur und Geschichte GmbH, 2010. ISBN 978-3-03919-146-8
