= Suggestion und Hypnotismus in der Völkerpsychologie =

Book by Otto Stoll

Suggestion und Hypnotismus in der Völkerpsychologie (translatable as Suggestion and Hypnotism in Folk Psychology or Suggestion and Hypnotism in the Psychology of the Nations, etc.) is a work by the Swiss linguist and ethnologist Otto Stoll (1849–1922) which is regarded as an early contribution to comparative cultural psychopathology and social psychology.

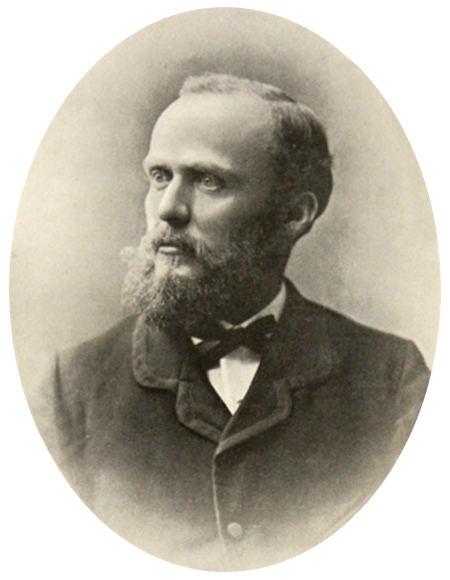
Otto Stoll (1849–1922)

The trained medicine Stoll (Dr. med.) was professor of geography and ethnology at the University of Zurich. The book was published in a second revised and expanded edition (Veit, Leipzig 1904). It deals with suggestion and hypnosis as cross-cultural psychological phenomena. Stoll combines experimental psychology with ethnological case studies from non-European cultures. The book analyzes trance, magic, religious ecstasy, and collective influence.

In his preface he writes, that the sole purpose he pursued with his work was to draw the attention of ethnologists to a category of psychological phenomena that, until now, have practically received no attention in the field of ethnology.

The book was of influence on the main work of Elias Canetti (1905–1994).

Already, Auguste Forel (1848–1931) had referred to its first edition (of 1894) as an 'excellent work'. Regarding the historical and ethnological importance of suggestion, in a later English edition Forel says (using the second edition):

I must refer my readers to the estimable work of Professor Otto Stoll, "Suggestion and Hypnotism in the Psychology of the Nations." Its action shows itself in all races, in all grades of culture, and plays an important part especially in religion and mysticism. Stoll has shown that this is so, very strikingly. One can trace it phylogenetically from the lowest developed races down to the various species of the animal kingdom.

== Editions ==
- Otto Stoll: Suggestion und Hypnotismus in der Völkerpsychologie. K. F. Koehler, Leipzig 1894 (first edition)
- Otto Stoll: Suggestion und Hypnotismus in der Völkerpsychologie. 2. umgearbeitete und vermehrte Auflage. Veit, Leipzig 1904. - Verzeichnis der zitierten Literatur, p. 724 ff.

=== A ===
- Abulgasi-Bayadur-Chan, Histoire généalogique des Tatares, traduite du manuscript tatare et enrichie d’un grand nombre de remarques authentiques et trés-curieuses sur le véritable estat présent de l’Asie septentrionale, par D... Leyde 1726.
- Abul-Ghazi Bèhadour Khan, Histoire des Mogols et des Tatares, publiée, traduite et annotée par le baron Desmaisons. St. Pétersbourg 1871 u. 1874.
- Aldrovandi, Ulysses, De animalibus insectis libri VII. Francofurti 1623.
- Allen’s, Illustrated Guide to Niagara. Buffalo 1888.
- Année scientifique et industrielle etc. par L. Fiquer (37e année 1893). Paris 1894.

=== B ===
- Bailly, Mémoires d'un témoin de la révolution ou Journal des faits qui se sont passés sous ses yeux, et qui ont préparé et fixé la constitution française (Ausg. von Berville et Barrière). 3 Bde. Paris 1821 u. 1822.
- Barros, J. de, Da Asia, dos feitos, que os Portuguezes fizeram no descubrimento, e conquista dos mares, e terras do Oriente. Decada IVa. Lisboa 1777.
- Barzellotti, G., David Lazzaretti di Arcidosso detto il Santo, i suoi seguaci e la sua leggenda. Bologna 1885.
- Batoutah, Ibn, Voyages d'Ibn Batoutah, texte arabe, accompagné d'une traduction par C. Defrémery et le Dr. B. R. Sanguinetti. Paris 1873–1879.
- Beauchamp, H., Walking through fire (hot ashes) in: Madras Government Museum, Bulletin, vol. IV, no 1. Madras 1901.
- Beaumont, G. de, L'Irlande sociale, politique et religieuse. 2 Bde. Bruxelles 1843.
- Beer, A., Allgemeine Geschichte des Welthandels. 2. Aufl. Wien 1862.
- Benfey, Th., Pantschatantra. Deutsch mit Einleitung und Anmerkungen. Leipzig 1859.
- Bergeron, P., Le voyage de Guillaume de Rubruquis en diverses parties de l’Orient et principalement en Tartarie et à la Chine, écrit par lui-même, in: Bergeron, P., Voyages faits principalement en Asie dans les XII, XIII, XIV et XV siècles etc. A la Haye 1735. digitalized copy
- Bergsøe, V., Iagttagelser om den italienske Tarantel og bidrag til Tarantismens Historie i Middelalderen og nyere Tid. Kjöbenhavn 1865 (Separ., in : Naturhistorisk Tidsskrift 3 R. 3 B.).
- Bernheim, H., De la suggestion et de ses applications à la thérapeutique. 3e ed. Paris 1891.
- Bertrand, A., Du magnétisme animal en France et des judgements qu'en ont portés les sociétés savantes, suivi de considérations sur l’apparition de l’extase dans les traitements magnétiques. Paris 1826.
- Besenval, Mémoires du baron de (Ausgabe von Berville et Barrière). 2 Bde. Paris 1821.

[725]

- Bessel, F. W., Über Maß und Gewicht im allgemeinen und das preußische Längenmaß im besonderen, in: Populäre Vorlesungen über wissenschaftliche Gegenstände, nach dem Tode des Verfassers herausgegeben von H. C. Schumacher. Hamburg 1848.
- Bleuler, E. und Lehmann, K., Zwangsmäßige Lichtempfindungen durch Schall und verwandte Erscheinungen auf dem Gebiete der anderen Sinnesempfindungen. Leipzig 1881.
- Bloomfield, M., The Atharvaveda. In: Grundriß der indo-arischen Philologie und Altertumskunde. Bd. II, 1. Heft. B. Straßburg 1899.
- Bonghi, R., Francesco d'Assisi, Studio. Città di Castello 1884. digitalized copy
- Brasseur de Bourbourg, Ch., Histoire des nations civilisées du Mexique et de Amérique-Centrale durant les siécles antérieures á Christophe Colomb. Paris 1857–1859.
- -- Popol Vuh, le livre sacré et les mythes de l’antiquité américaine avec les livres héroiques et historiques des Quichés. Paris 1861.
- Brinton, D. G., Nagualism, a Study in Native American Folk-lore and History. Philadelphia 1894.
- -- The Annals of the Cakchiquels, the original text, with a translation, notes and introduction: Philadelphia 1885.
- Brugsch, H., Der Hypnotismus bei den Alten, in: Aus dem Morgenlande, Altes und Neues. Leipzig, Reclam-Ausgabe 8151 und 8152.
- Buch, L. von, Über die Ursachen der Verbreitung großer Alpengeschiebe, in: Abhandl. d. physik. Klasse der königl. preuß. Ak. der Wissenschaften aus den Jahren 1804–1811. Berlin 1815.
- Buch Mosis, das sechste und siebente, das ist: Mosis magische Geisterkunst, das Geheimnis aller Geheimnisse. Wort- und bildgetreu nach der alten Handschrift, so im Vatikan in Rom aufbewahrt wird. Schwäbisch Hall (ohne Jahrzahl).
- Buchanan, Fr., A journey from Madras through the countries of Mysore, Canara and Malabar. London 1807.
- Burg, von der. De geneesheer in Nederlandsch Indië, II, S. 119. (Mir nicht zugänglich, enthält nach freundlicher Mitteilung von Herrn Dr. H. Kate einige Angaben über die Latah.)
- Busch, M., Wunderliche Heilige. Religiöse und politische Geheimbünde und Sekten. Leipzig 1879. digitalized copy
- Büttikofer, J., Reisebilder aus Liberia. Leiden 1890.

=== C ===
- Campan, Madame, Mémoires sur la vie privee de Marie-Antoinette, reine de France et de Navarre. 2e éd. 3 Bde. Paris 1823.
- Capefique, M., Histoire de France au Moyen âge. 4 Bde. Bruxelles 1843.
- Cassini, De la grandeur et de la figure de la terre, in: Suite des Mémoires de l’académie royale des sciences, annee 1718. Paris 1720.
- Cautio criminalis sev de processibus contra sagas liber. das ist: Peinliche Warschawung von Anstell: vnd Führung des Prozesses gegen die angegebene Zauberer, Hexen vnd Vnholden : An die Obrigkeit Teutscher Nation, so wohl auch Deroselben Rhäten, Beichtvätteren, Commissarien, Inquisitoren, Richteren, Advokaten, Priestern vnd Predigern vnd andern sehr nützlich vnd nötig. — Durch einen vnbenahmpten Römisch-Katholischen an Tag gegeben, nunmehr dem Gemeinen Vatterland vnd männiglich zum besten ins Teutsch trewlich vbersetzet, sampt einem ordentlichen Register durch H. S. S. Franckfurt am Mayn 1649.

[726]

- Colombo, Fernando, Historie del Signor D. Fernando Golombo, nelle quali s'hà particolare e vera relatione della vita, e de fatti dell‘ Ammiraglio D. Christoforo Colombo auo Padre, e dello scoprimento, cb'egli fece dell‘ Indie Occidentali, detto Mondo Nnovo, hora possedute nell‘ Serenissimo Rè Cattolico. Nuovamente di lingua Spagnuola tradotte nell’ Italiana dal Sign. Alfonso Ulloa. Venezia 1685.
- Coranus, s. Flügel.
- Correspondance littéraire, philosophique et critique adressée à un Souverain d'Allemagne depuis 1753 jusqu'en 1769 par le baron de Grimm et par Diderot, I. Paris 1813.
- Couto, Diogo de, Da Asia, dos feitos, que os Portaguezes fizeram na conquista, e descubrimento das terras, e mares do Oriente. Decada IVa. Lisboa 1778.
- Cysat, P., Beschreibung des berühmbten Lucerner oder 4 Waldstätten Sees vnd dessen Fürtrefflichen Qualiteten vnd sonderbaren Ejgenschafiten. Lucern 1661. digitalized copy

=== D ===
- Dapper, C., Umbständliche und eigentliche Beschreibung von Africa. Amsterdam 1670.
- Delbrück, A. Dr., Die pathologische Lüge und die psychisch abnormen Schwindler. Eine Untersuchung über den allmählichen Übergang eines normalen psychologischen Vorganges in ein patholoisches Symptom für Ärzte und Juristen. Stuttgart 1891.
- Dennys, N. B., The Folk-lore of China. Hongkong 1876. digitalized copy
- Diodori Siculi bibliotheca historica.
- Diogenes Laërtius, De vitis, dogmatis et apophthegmatibus eorum qui in philosophia clarvervnt libri X Thoma Aldrobandino interprete (Prooemiam). Romae 1594.
- Dixon, W., Hepworth, Spiritual wives. Leipzig 1868 (Tauchnitz edition). Deutsch von J. Frese unter dem Titel: „Seelenbräute". Berlin 1868 (I, II).
- Dobrizhoffer, M., Geschichte der Abiponer, einer berittenen und kriegerischen Nation in Paraquay. 3 Bde. Wien 1783–1784.
- Dubois, J. A., Description of the character, manners and customs of the People of India. London 1817.
- Dubois, R., Ètude sur le mécanisme de la thermogénèse et du sommeil chez les mammifères: Physiologie comparée de la marmotte, in: Annales de l‘Universite de Lyon. Paris 1896.
- Dulaure, Esquisses historiques des principaux événemens de la révolution française depuis la convocation des états-généraux jusqu’au rétablissement de la Maison de Bourbon. 5 Bde. Paris 1823.
- Dumouriez, La vie et les mémoires du général D. (Ausgabe von Berville et Barrière). 4 Bde. Paris 1822. 1823.
- Du Perron, Anquetil, Zend-Avesta t. I (Vie de Zoroastre). Paris 1771.

=== E ===
- Eusebii Pamphili ecclesiasticae historiae libri X, ejusdem De vita Constantini libri IV nec non Constantini oratio ad Sanctos et panegyricus Eusebii, adj. E. Zimmermannus. Frankfurt am Main 1822.

=== F ===
- Fauriel, M. C., Histoire de la croisade contre les hérétiques Albigeois, écrite en vers provençaux par un poëte contemporain (Aiso es la cansos de crozada contr els ereges Dalbeges). Paris 1837. digitalized copy
- Ferrières, Marquis de, Mémoires pour servir à l’histoire de la revolution française (Ausgabe von Berville et Barrière). 3 Bde. Paris 1821.

[727]

- Fieffé, E., Histoire des troupes étrangères au service de France depuis leur origine jusqu’à nos jours et de tous les régiments levés dans les pays conquis. Paris 1854. (vgl. Geschichte der Fremd-Truppen im Dienste Frankreichs: von ihrer Entstehung bis auf unsere Tage I, II)
- Finsler, G., Die religiöse Erweckung der zehner und zwanziger Jahre unseres Jahrhunderts in der deutschen Schweiz, in: Zürcher Taschenbuch auf das Jahr 1890. Zürich 1890.
- Flacourt de, Histoire de la Grande Isle de Madagascar. Paris 1661. digitalized copy
- Fluegel, G., Corani textus arabicus, ed. tertium emendata. Lipsiae 1869.
- Foucaux, Ph. Ed., Rgya tch’er rol pa ou développement des jeux, contenant l'histoire du Bouddha Çakya-Mouni traduit sur la Version tibétaine du Bkah Hgyour et revu sur l’original Sanskrit (Lalitavistâra). 2 Bde. Paris 1847 — 1848. digitalized copy*
- Francisci, Erasmus, Der höllische Proteus oder tausendkünstige Versteller. Nürnberg 1695.
- Francisque-Michel, Le pays basque, sa population, sa langue, ses moeurs, sa littérature et sa musique. Paris 1857.
- Fritsch, G., Die Eingeborenen Süd-Afrikas ethnologisch und anatomisch beschrieben. Breslau 1872. digitalized copy
- Fuentes y Guzman, Francisco Antonio de, Historia de Guatemala ó Recopilacion Florida que publica por primera vez con notas é ilustraciones D. Justo Zaragoza. Madrid 1882–1883.

=== G ===
- Gage, Thomas, Neue merckwürdige Reise-Beschreibung nach Neu Spanien. Leipzig 1693.
- Garbe, R., Samkhya und Yoya, in: Grundriß der indo-arischen Philologie und Altertumskunde, Bd. III Straßburg 1896. digitalized copy
- Garcilasso de la Vega, Historia general del Perv. Cordoua 1617.
- Gigli, G., Superstizioni, pregiudizi e tradizioni in Terra d'Otranto, con un‘ aggiunta di canti e fiabe popolari. Firenze 1893. digitalized copy
- Gmelin, J. G., Reise durch Sibirien von dem Jahr 1733 bis 1743. 4 Bde. Göttingen 1751–1752.
- Goltz, von der, Zauberei und Hexenkünste, Spiritismus und Schamanismus in China, in: Mitteil. d. deutschen Ges. f. Natur- und Völkerkunde Ostasiens. 51. Heft (Bd. VI, S. 1—36). Tokio 1893.
- Grashey, Prof. Dr., Hirt, Prof. Dr., Schrenck-Notzing, Dr. Freiherr von, Preyer, Prof. Dr., Der Prozeß Czynski. Tatbestand desselben und Gutachten über Willensbeschr&nkung durch hypnotisch-suggestiven Einfluß, abgegeben vor dem oberbayerischen Schwurgericht zu München. Stuttgart 1895.
- Grey, G., Journals of two expeditions of discovery in North West and Western Australia during the years 1837, 1838 and 1839 under the Authority of her Majesty's Government. London 1841,
- Grill, J., Hundert Lieder des Atharva-Veda. 1. Aufl. in: Progr. des k. württ. evang.-theol. Seminars Maulbronn. Tübingen 1879. (2. Aufl. Stuttgart 1889. digitalized copy)
- Guzman, Fernan Perez de, Generaciones y Semblanzas. Madrid 1790.

=== H ===
- Hallam, H., L'Europe au moyen âge, traduit de l’anglais, par A. Borghers et P. Dudouit. 2 Bde. Bruxelles 1840.
- Harnack, A., Das Wesen des Christentums, sechzehn Vorlesungen für Studierende aller Fakultäten im Wintersemester 1899/1900 an der Universität Berlin gehalten. 5. Aufl. Leipzig 1901.
- — Die Mission und Ausbreitung des Christentums in den ersten drei Jahrhunderten. Leipzig 1902. (digitalized copy: I, II)

[728]

- Hase, K., Franz von Assisi, ein Heiligenbild. Leipzig 1856.
- Hecker, J. F. C., Der schwarze Tod im vierzehnten Jahrhundert, nach den Quellen für Ärzte und gebildete Nichtärzte bearbeitet Berlin 1832.
- — Die Tanzwut, eine Volkskrankheit im Mittelalter, nach den Quellen für Ärzte und gebildete Nichtärzte bearbeitet Berlin 1832.
- Hernandez, Francisco, Opera. 3 Bde. Matriti 1790. S. auch Ximenez.
- Herodoti historiarum libri IX.
- Herrera, Antonio de, Historia general de los hechos de los Castellanos en las ielas y tierra firme del Mar Oceano. 5 Bde. Madrid 1730.
- Hexenprozeß (der) und die Blutschwitzer-Prozedur, zwei Fälle aus der Kriminalpraxis des Kantons Zug aus den Jahren 1787—1738 und 1849. Zug 1849.
- Hillebrandt, A., Rituallitteratur. Vedische Opfer und Zauber. In: Grundriß der indo-arischen Philologie und Altertumskunde. Bd. III. Straßburg 1897.
- Histoire des diables de Loudun ou de la possession des Religieuses Ursulines et de la condamnation et du supplice d'Urbain Grandier, euré de la même ville, cruels efiets de la vengeance du Cardinal de Richelieu. Amsterdam 1740.
- Histoire des Martyrs persécvtez et mis à mort pour la vérité de l'Euangile, depuis le temps des Apostres iusques à l’an 1597. (1597.)
- Hommel, F., Die semitischen Völker und Sprachen. Leipzig 1883.
- Honigberger, J. M., Früchte aus dem Morgenlande oder Reise-Erlebnisse, nebst naturhistorisch-medizinischen Erfahrungen, einigen Hundert erprobten Arzneimitteln und einer neuen Heilart, dem Medialsysteme. Wien 1853.
- Horst, G. C., Zauberbibliothek oder von Zauberei, Theurgie und Mantik, Zauberern, Hexenprozessen, Dämonen, Gespenstern und Geistererscheinungen. Mainz 1821—1826.

=== I ===
- Irañeta y Jauregui, Manuel, Tratado del tarantismo ó enfermedad originada del veneno de la tarántula segun las observaciones que hizo en los Reales Hospitales del Quartel General de San Roque. Madrid 1785. digitalized copy
- Irenaei, contra omnes Haereses libri V. London 1702.

=== J ===
- Jackson, A. V. Williams, Die iranische Religion, in: Grundriß der iranischen Philologie. Bd. II. Straßburg 1900.
- Johnston, Sir H., The Uganda Protectorate. v. II. London 1902.
- Jolly, J., Medizin, in: Grundriß der indo-arischen Philologie und Altertumskunde. Bd. III, Heft 10. Straßburg 1901.
- Jülg, B., Die Märchen des Siddhi-Kür. Leipzig 1866.
- Julien, Stanislas, Mémoire sur les contrées occidentales, transcrit du sanskrit en chinois en l‘an 648, par Hiouen Thsang. Paris 1857—1858.
- Jungfrauen, die Tyroler ekstatischen, Leitsterne in die dunkeln Gebiete der Mystik. 2 Bde. Regensburg 1843. digitalized copy: I, II [anonym by Wilhelm Volk (pseud. L. Clarus)]

=== K ===
- Kaempfer, E., Amoenitatum exoticarum politico-physico-medicarum fasciculi V. Lemgoviae 1712.
- Kämpfer, E., Geschichte und Beschreibung von Japan, aus den Originalhandhandschriften des Verfassers, herausgegeben von Chr. W. Dohm. 2 Bde. Lemgo 1777–1779.
- Kempermann, P., Reise durch die Zentralprovinzen Japans, in: Mitteil. d. deutsch. Ges. f. Natur- und Völkerkunde Ostasiens, Heft 14 (1878).

[729]

- Kerner, Justinus, Die Seherin von Prevorst. Eröffnungen über das innere Leben des Menschen und über das Hineinragen der Geisterwelt in die unsere. 2 Tle. Stuttgart und Tübingen 1829.
- Koch, Th., Der Paradiesgarten als Schnitzmotiv der Payaguá-Indianer, in Globus. Bd. 88 Nr. 8. 1903.
- Крашенинников (Krascheninnikow), Описание Камчатки. 2 Bde. St. Petersburg 1818–1819.

=== L ===
- Lactanti, Lucii Cäcilii Firmiani, De mortibus persecutorum liber (Oxonii 1680).
- Lane, E. W., An account of the Manners and Customs of Modern Egyptians. 2 Bde. London 1846.
- Lardy, Ch., Les procédures de sorcellerie à Neuchâtel. Neuchâtel 1866.
- Las Casas, Fray Bartolomé de, Apologética Historia cuánto á las cualidades, dispusicion, descripcion, cielo y suelo destas tierras, y condiciones naturales, policias, repúblicas, maneras de vivir y costumbres de las gentes destas Indias occidentales y meridionales, cuyo imperio soberano pertenece á los Reyes de Castilla. Dieses für die gesamte Ethnographie, Geographie und Naturgeschichte des spanischen Amerika wichtige Werk des Bischofs von Chiapa existiert bis jetzt bloß in zwei Handschriften in Madrid und Philadelphia. Einige ethnographisch wichtige Kapitel daraus sind als „Apéndice“ dem 5. Bande der „Historia de las Indias“ beigedruckt
- -- Historia de las Indias, ahora por primera vez dada á luz por El Marqués de la Fuensanta del Valle y D. José Sancho Rayon. 5 Bde. Madrid 1875 bis 1876.
- Lassen, Chr., Indische Altertumskunde. Leipzig 1871 (1. Aufl.).
- Laufer, H., Beiträge zur Kenntnis der Tibetischen Medizin. 2 Tle. Berlin und Leipzig. 1900.
- Leite de Vasconellos, J., Tradições populares de Portugal. Porto 1882. (Bibliotheca ethnographica portugueza, vol. I.) digitalized copy
- Lenormant, F., La divination et la science des presages chez les Chaldéens. Paris 1875.
- — La magie chez les Chaldéens et les origines Accadiennes. Paris 1874.
- ***, A., (Lewschin), ***. 3 Bde. St Petersburg 1832.
- Ling Roth, H., The Natives of Sarawak and British North Borneo. vol. I. London 1896.
- Livingstone, D., Missionary travels and researches in South Africa. London 1857.
- Livingstone, D. and Ch., Narrative of an expedition to the Zambesi and its tributaries and of the discovery of the lakes Shirwa and Nyassa 1858–1864. London 1865.
- Lombroso, C., Pazzi ed anomali, saggi. Cittá di Castello 1886.

=== M ===
- Malleus maleficarum, maleficas et earum haeresim vt phramea potcutissima contenens. Anno XX. Coloniae excvdebat Joannes Gymnicvs.
- Mantegazza, P., India. 4a ed. Milano 1888.
- Marc Pol, Voyage de Marc Pol. In: Recueil de voyages et de mémoires publié par la Société de Géographie, t. I. Paris 1824. digitalized copy
- Martyr ab Angleria, Petrus, De rebus Oceanicis et Novo Orbe decades tres, Coloniae 1574.

[730]

- Méchain et Delambre, Base du Systeme mètrique décimal ou mesure de l'arc du méridien compris entre les parallèles de Dunkerque et Barcelone, exécutée en 1792 et anées suivantes. t. I. Paris 1806.
- Metzger, E., Einiges über Amok und Mataglap, in: Globus, Bd. LII, 1887.
- Meyer, C., Der Aberglaube des Mittelalters und der nächstfolgenden Jahrhunderte. Basel 1884.
- Meyer, J. L., Schwärmerische Gräuelscenen oder Kreuzigungsgeschichte einer religiösen Schwärmerinn in Wildensbuch, Canton Zürich. Ein merkwürdiger Beytrag zur Geschichte des religiösen Fanatismus. 2. Aufl. Zürich 1824
- Michaud, Histoire des Croisades. 10 Bde. Paris 1812—1822.
- Michelet, Procès des Templiers. 2 Bde. Paris 1841 und 1851. In: Collection de documents inédits sur l‘histoire de France. 1e Serie: Histoire politiqne.
- Miclucho Maclay, N. von, Ein Opium-Rauchversuch. In: Natuurkundig Tijdschrift voor Nederlandsch Indië. D. 85. 1875.
- Middendorf, A. Th. von, Reise in den äußersten Norden und Osten Sibiriens: Bd. IV, Teil 2. St. Petersburg 1875.
- Molina, Fray Alonso de, Vocabulario de la lengua Mexicana (ed. facsim. por J. Platzmann). Leipzig 1880.
- Monardes Nicolas, 1a y 2a y 3a partes de la Historia Medicinal: de las cosas que se traen de nuestras Indias Occidentales, que siruen en Medicina. Sevilla 1580.
- Mooney, J., The medical mythology of Ireland. In: Proceed. Am. Phil. Soc. Philadelphia 1887.
- Mouton, G., Observationes diametrorum solis et lunae apparentium meridianarumque aliquot altitudinum solis et paucarum fixarum. Lugduni 1670.
- Mucker in der Einsamkeit (der). Ein Beitrag zur Sitten-Geschichte des 19. Jahrhunderts. Leipzig 1887 (1. Die Mucker in Königsberg. 2. Mucker-Aphorismen.)
- Myrial, Mme A., Les Mantras aux Indes, in: Bull, et Mém. de la Soc. d'Anthropologie de Paris. V sér. t. II. Paris 1901.

=== N ===
- Nachtigal, G., Saharâ und Sûdân. Ergebnisse sechsjähriger Reisen in Afrika. 8 Bde. Berlin 1879—1881 (I. II). Leipzig 1889 (III).
- Nansen, Fridtjof, Eskimoleben, aus dem Norwegischen übersetzt von M. Langfeldt. Berlin 1908.
- Navarrete, D. Martin Fernandez de, Colección de los viajes y descubrimientos que hicieron por mar los Españoles desde fines del siglo XV. 5 Bde. Madrid 1837—1888.
- Nöldeke, Th., Orientalische Skizzen. Berlin 1892.

=== O ===
- Origenis contra Celsum libri VIII. Zitiert ist die deutsche Übersetzung von J. L. Mosheim. Hamburg 1745.
- Oviedo y Valdés, Gonzalo Fernandez de, Historia general y natural de las Indias, Islas y Tierra-firme del Mar Océano, 2a ed. 4 Bde. Madrid 1851 — 1855.

=== P ===
- Pallas, P. S., Reise durch verschiedene Provinzen des russischen Reiches. 2. Aufl. Petersburg 1801.
- Pausaniae descriptio Graeciae.
- Perham, Sea Dyak religion. In: Journ. of the Straits Branch of the Royal Asiatic Society 1882 (Cit. nach Wilken, Het Shamanisme).
- Petersen, Chr., Der geheime Gottesdienst der Griechen. In: Verzeichnis der

[731]

öffentlichen und Privatvorlesungen, welche am Hamburgischen akademischen Gymnasium von Ostern 1848—1849 gehalten werden. Hamburg 1848.

- Pitaval, der neue. Eine Sammlung der interessantesten Criminalgeschichten aller Länder aus älterer und neuerer Zeit. 6. Teil. Leipzig 1844.
- Plutarchi Scripta moralia, emend. Fred. Dübner. 2 Bde. Parisiis 1841.
- Preyer, W., Der Hypnotismus. Ausgew. Schriften von J. Braid, deutsch herausgegeben von W. Preyer. Berlin 1882.
- Prichard, J. C., Researches into the phjsical history of mankind, 4th ed. London 1841—1855.
- Puiségur, Marquis de, Mémoires pour servir à l’histoire et à l’établissement du magnétisme animal. Londres 1786.

=== R ===
- Radloff, Dr. W., Aus Sibirien. Lose Blätter aus meinem Tagebuche. 2 Bde. Leipzig 1893.
- Regnard, P., Les maladies épidémiques de l’esprit: sorcellerie, magnétisme, morphinisme, délire des grandeurs. Paris 1887. digitalized copy
- Römer, J. J., u. Schinz, H. R., Naturgeschichte der in der Schweiz einheimischen Säugetiere. Ein Handbuch für Kenner und Liebhaber. Zürich 1809.
- Roskoff, G., Geschichte des Teufels. Leipzig 1869.
- Rosny, Lucien de, Les Antilles. Étude d'Ethnographie et d‘Archéologie américaines. Paris 1886—1887.

=== S ===
- Sachs, Darstellung der pietistischen Umtriebe in Königsberg, siehe Dixon, Seelenbräute, II. Anhang. digitalized copy
- Sahagun, Fray Bernardino de, Historia general de las cosas de Nueva España, da la á luz con notas y suplementos Cárlos Maria de Bustamante. Mexico 1829-1830.
- Salat, J., Versuche über Supernaturalismus und Mystizismus. Auch ein Beitrag zur Geschichte der höheren Wissenschaften in Deutschland. Mit historisch-psychologischen Aufschlüssen über die vielbesprochene Mystik in Bayern und Ober-Österreich. Sulzbach 1823.
- Salisbury, Jean de, s. Thierry.
- Schaalje, M., De kleine voeten der vrouwen in China. Eene bijdrage tot de kennis van chineesche gewoonten, in: Tijdschrift voor Indische Taal-, Land- en Volkenkunde. Deel XX, p. 33 sqq. Batavia 1873.
- Schack, A. Fr. von, Heldensagen des Firdusi in deutscher Nachbildung, 3 Bde., in: Cottasche Bibliothek der Weltliteratur. Stuttgart
- Schellong, O., Das Barlumfest der Gegend Finschhafens (Kaiser-Wilhelms-Land), ein Beitrag zur Kenntnis der Beschneidung der Melanesier, in: Internat Arch. f. Ethnographie Bd. II, S. 145 ff. Leiden 1889.
- Scheube, B., Die Ainos, in: Mitteil. d. deutschen Ges. f. Natur- u. Völkerkunde Ostasiens, Heft 25.
- Scheuchzer, J. J., Beschreibung der Naturgeschichten des Schweizerlandes. Zürich 1706. (I. S. 57: Von dem Heimwehe.)
- Schiefner, A., Kalewala, das National-Epos der Finnen, nach der zweiten Ausgabe ins Deutsche übertragen. Helsingfors 1852.
- — Über die Heldensagen der Minussinschen Tataren. In: Bull. de la classe des sciences hist. phil. et pol. de l'Acad. Imp. des Sciences de St. Petersbourg. 1858. t XV. Nr. 23. 24. digitalized copy
- Schrader, E., Die Keilinschriften und das Alte Testament, 3. Aufl. mit Ausdehnung auf die Apokryphen, Pseudepigraphen und das Neue Testament,

[732]

neu bearbeitet von Professor Dr. H. Zimmern und Dr. H. Winkler. Berlin 1903.

- Schrenck, A. G., Reise nach dem Nordosten des europäischen Rußlands, durch die Tundren der Samojeden zum Arktischen Uralgebirge. Dorpat 1848.
- Schrenck, L. von, Die Völker des Amurlandes, in: Reisen und Forschungen im Amurlande, Bd. III. St. Petersburg 1881.
- Schupp, A. (S. J.), Die „Mucker“, eine Erzählung aus dem Leben der deutschen Kolonien Brasiliens in der Gegenwart. Paderborn 1900.
- Schurtz, H., Altersklassen und Männerbünde. Eine Darstellung der Grundformen der Gesellschaft. Berlin 1902.
- Seler, E., Altmexikanische Studien II, 1. Zauberei und Zauberer im alten Mexiko, in: Veröff. aus dem k. Mus. f. Völkerkunde. Berlin 1899.
- Siete partidas, las, del rey Don Alfonso el Sabio. 2 Bde. Madrid 1807.
- Skeat, W. W., Malay Magic, being an Introduction to the folklore and popular religion of the Malay Peninsula. London 1900.
- Soldan, W. G., Geschichte der Hexenprozesse aus den Quellen dargestellt. Stuttgart und Tübingen 1843 (1. Aufl.).
- Sorcery in Coimbatore, in: Madras Government Museum, Bulletin, vol. IV n. 1 (Anthropology). Madras 1901.
- Spiegel, Fr., Avesta, die heiligen Schriften der Parseu, aus dem Grundtext übersetzt mit steter Rücksicht auf die Tradition. 3 Bde. Leipzig 1852.
- Spiegel, Fr., Erânische Altertumskunde. 3 Bde. Leipzig 1871 — 1878.
- Staël, Mme la baronne de, Considérations sur les principaux événements de la révolution françoise, 2e éd. 3 Bde. Paris 1818.
- Steinen, K. von den, Der Paradiesgarten als Schnitzmotiv der Payaguá-Indianer, in: Ethnol. Notizblatt, II. Heft 2. 1901.
- Stokar, C., David Spleiss, weiland Antistes der Schaffhauser'schen Kirche: nach dessen schriftlichem Nachlaß und mündlichen Nachrichten. Basel 1858. digitalized copy
- Stoll, O., Die Ethnologie der Indianerstämme von Guatemala. Leiden 1889. (Suppl. zu Bd. I des Intern. Arch. f. Ethnographie).
- — Guatemala. Reisen und Schilderungen aus den J. 1878—1883. Leipzig 1886.
- Strabonis Geographica.
- Strauss, D. F., Das Leben Jesu, kritisch bearbeitet. 3. Aufl. Tübingen 1838.

=== T ===
- Tacitus, C. Cornelius, Ab excessu Divi Augusti historiarum libri V (ed. J. C. Orellius). Zürich 1847.
- Talmud Babli, Babylonischer Talmud, Tractat Berachoth. Segensprüche mit deutscher Übersetzung und den Kommentaren Raschi u. Tosephot u. s. w. Herausgegeben von E. M. Pinner. Berlin 1842.
- Taplin, G., The Folk-lore, Manners, Customs and Languages of the South Australian Aborigines: gathered from inquiries made by Authority of the South Australian Government. Adelaide 1879.
- Tertulliani Apologeticus (Ausg. von Lyon 1825).
- Testamentum novum, graece ed. Oscar de Gebhardt. Lipsiae 1887.
- Thévenot de, Relation d'vn Voyage fait au Levant. Paris 1665. (Im Text als I bezeichnet.)
- — Suite du Voyage du Levant. Paris 1674. (Im Text als II bezeichnet)
- Thierry, A., Histoire de la conquête de l’Angleterre par les Normands. 7e éd., in: Oeuvres complètes de Augustin Th. 4 Bde. Paris 1846.

[733]

- Thiers A., Histoire de la révolution française. 6 Bde. Leipzig 1846 (Ausg. von Brockhaus).
- — Histoire de Law. Paris 1868 (Bibliothèque contemporaine).
- Tholuck, A., Vermischte Schriften, größtenteils apologetischen Inhalts. Hamburg 1839.
- Torquemada, Juan de, Priméra, segunda y tercera parte de los veinte i vn libros rituales i monarchia Indiana, con el origen y guerras de los Indios Ocidentales, de sus Poblaciones, Descubrimiento, Conquista, Conuersion, y otras cosas marauillosas de la mesma tierra, distribuydos en tres tomos. 2. Ausg. Madrid 1728.
- Tschudi, J. J. von, Reisen durch Südamerika. 5 Bde. Leipzig 1860 — 1869.

=== V ===
- Valletta, Nicola, II celebre trattato della jettatura. Roma 1891 (Bibliotheca magica).
- Vogt, Carl, Nordfahrt entlang der Norwegischen Küste nach dem Nordkap, den Inseln Jan Mayen und Island. Frankfurt am Main 1863. digitalized copy

=== W ===
- Watters, T., Chinese Fox Myths. In: Journ. of the North China Branch of the Royal Asiatic Society 1874.
- Weier, Johannes, De praestigiis daemonum: Von Teufelsgespenst, Zauberern, Gifftbereytem , Schwartzkünstlern, Hexen und Vnholden. Frankfurt am Mayn 1586.
- Wesley, J., Works (zitiert nach Tholuck, verm. Schriften).
- Wiedemann, A., Die im Regierungsbezirke Schwaben und Neuburg vorkommenden Kriechtiere und Lurche, in: Bericht des Naturw. Vereins zu Augsburg 1887.
- Wilken, G. A., Het shamanisme bij den volken van den Indischen Archipel. In: Bijdragen to te Taal-, Land-, en Volkenkunde van Nederlandsch-Indië. 5 volgreeks 2 deel S’Gravenhage 1887. (Separ.)
- Williams, Fiji and the Fijians (zitiert nach Wilken, het shamanisme).
- Wirth, M., Geschichte der Handelskrisen. 2. Aufl. Frankfurt a. M. 1874.
- Wolf, R., Handbuch der Astronomie, ihrer Geschichte und Literatur. 2 Bde. Zürich 1892.

=== X ===
- Ximenez, Fray Francisco, Las historias del origen de los Indios de esta provincia de Guatemala, traducidos de la lengua Quiché al castellano. Viena 1857 (herausgegeben von Dr. C. Scherzer).
- — Cuatro libros de la naturaleza y virtudes medicinales de las plantas y animales de la Nueva España (Mexico 1515). 2. Ausg. Morelia 1888.

=== Y ===
- Young, Arthur, Reise durch Ireland nebst Betrachtungen über den gegenwärtigen Zustand dieses Reichs in den Jahren 1776, 1777 und 1778 bis zu Ende des Jahres 1779. (Aus dem Engl.) Leipzig 1780.
- Ysbrants Ides, E., Driejaarigc reize naar China, te lande gedaan door den Moskovischen Afgezant E. Ysbrants Ides. Amsterdam 1704.

=== Z ===
- Zürcher, J., Jeanne Darc, vom psychologischen und psychopathologischen Standpunkte aus. Dissertation. Leipzig 1895.

== See also ==
- Philippe de Félice
