= Pestalozzi family =

Bourgeois family from Zurich active in commerce and politics

Pestalozzi Pestalozza, Pestalozze, Pestalutz, Pestaluz, Pestaluzz
- Country: Switzerland
- Current region: Canton of Zurich
- Origin: Chiavenna, Italy
- Founded: 1550 (arrival in Zurich)
- Founder: Johann Anton Pestalozzi (1537-1604)
- Cadet branches: zum Brünneli, zum Trauben, Froschau

The Pestalozzi family is a bourgeois Italian family originally based in Gravedona and Chiavenna who settled in Switzerland (Zurich) during the Counter-Reformation. It rose to prominence in commerce and politics despite only gaining access to the city's governing councils at the end of the 18th century. During the 19th and 20th centuries, the Pestalozzi family distinguished itself in cantonal and national politics as well as in the economic sphere.

== History ==
=== Origins and early commercial activities ===
The family's history in Zurich began with Johann Anton Pestalozzi (1537-1604), who left Chiavenna around 1550 for Zurich, where he trained as an iron merchant alongside Bernhard von Cham. Of noble origin, he was sometimes qualified as donzel, a title that later disappeared as it was only attributed to people engaged in non-lucrative activities. In 1562, Johann Anton Pestalozzi married Anna Gessner, granddaughter of his second employer Andreas Gessner (1482-1568), and became a burgher of Zurich in 1567.

He founded his first company with Laurenz Bebie. The partners initially engaged in trading linen, cotton goods, velvet, and silk, then specialized in 1579 in silk commerce and processing. At the end of the 16th century, Pestalozzi partnered with his brother-in-law Cornelius Toma to import silk and cotton and export fleuret. After Johann Anton Pestalozzi's death in 1604, the heirs Andreas (1581-1646), Caspar (1585-1650), and Johann Anton Pestalozzi (1589-1677), from Johann Anton Pestalozzi's third marriage with Magdalena von Muralt, continued their association with Toma.

In 1617, they separated from Toma and renamed the company "Joh. Anthoni Pestalutz selig Erben." The enterprise, which maintained commercial relations with Bergamo, Milan, Lyon, Basel, Strasbourg, St. Gallen, Augsburg, and Calw, experienced great expansion through silk trade, notably because it benefited from fiscal privileges under the 1618 treaty between Zurich and Venice. The association lasted until 1653, when two of the three owners died. Andreas Pestalozzi's sons took over the enterprise, renamed "Andreas Pestalozzi und Gebrüder." Johann Anton (1589-1677) thereafter traded under the business name "Johann Anton Pestalozzi zum Brünneli."

Until the 19th century, the Pestalozzi remained primarily silk merchants. Cleophea Pestalozzi is considered one of the most important entrepreneurs of her time.

=== Political involvement ===
The election in 1662 of Johann Anton Pestalozzi (1589-1677) to the newly created seven-member commercial directorate (Kaufmännisches Direktorium) testifies to the family's importance among Zurich merchants. As important representatives of Zurich's merchant aristocracy, the Pestalozzi were nevertheless long excluded from the Council and only entered the Grand Council in 1767 with Hans Jakob Pestalozzi (1711-1787), representative of the Meise guild. Until the end of the Ancien Régime, the family accessed the Grand Council only five times and the Small Council only once with Hans Jakob Pestalozzi, representative of the Meise guild from 1788 to 1798.

Hans Jakob Pestalozzi continued his political career after the troubles of the Helvetic Revolution and sat again in the Small Council from 1803 to 1831. The Pestalozzi were received into the noble society of the Schildner zum Schneggen in 1770 with merchant Hans Konrad Pestalozzi (1727-1774), from the zum Trauben branch, who had received seat (Schild) number 5 of the society from his father-in-law Moritz Füssli.

=== Family alliances and genealogy ===
The Pestalozzi forged close ties with Zurich's leading families from the first generation, as evidenced by the marriage of Franziskus Pestalozzi (1563-1617), eldest son of the family ancestor Johann Anton Pestalozzi, and Margaretha Keller vom Steinbock, daughter of mayor and donzel Hans Keller. The Pestalozzi's godparents came from numerous donzel families, such as the von Wellenberg, von Schönau, Meyer von Knonau, or politically influential families, such as the von Grebel, Holzhalb, Heidegger, Rahn, Bodmer, and Schwyzer (Schweizer).

Franziskus (1573-1617), Johann Anton (1589-1677), and Andreas (1581-1646), sons of ancestor Johann Anton Pestalozzi, founded the three branches of the family. All Pestalozzi still living descend, in the male line, from Andreas's branch. The pedagogue Johann Heinrich Pestalozzi is also a descendant of Andreas.

Nearly two centuries after their arrival in Zurich, the Pestalozzi constituted a highly ramified family, owners of nine ideally situated residences (zum Weissen Turm, zum Brünneli, Froschau, Brunnenhof, zum Trauben, Mohrenkönig, zum Steinbock, Thalhof und Wolkenstein). Despite their large number, the Pestalozzi have maintained a keen sense of their family belonging. A family fund was established in 1750 to curb the social decline of certain family representatives, which numbered about a hundred members around 1900.

=== Modern political and economic activities ===
The family maintained its dominant position in Zurich even during the troubles of the Helvetic Revolution of 1798 and after the founding of the federal state in 1848. Until 2020, it counted 16 members in the Grand Council, including Friedrich Otto Pestalozzi, and two in the Small Council (from 1831 State Council) of Zurich. After 1861, the Pestalozzi sat four times in Zurich's municipal council and provided, with the radical Hans Konrad Pestalozzi, a mayor of the city (1889-1909).

The family counted only three politicians active at the national level: the National Councillors Hans Konrad Pestalozzi, already mentioned, and Friedrich Pestalozzi, as well as States Councillor Hans Jakob Pestalozzi. Economically, the steel trading and services company Pestalozzi has a history of more than 250 years.

== List of family members ==
- Hans Jakob Pestalozzi (1707–1782), German and Swiss merchant
- Anna Pestalozzi-Schulthess (1738–1815), Swiss educator and philanthropist
- Johann Heinrich Pestalozzi (1746–1827), Swiss pedagogue and educational reformer
- Hans Jakob Pestalozzi (1749–1831), Swiss merchant and politician
- Cleophea Pestalozzi (1750–1820), Swiss businesswoman who owned and directed a silk trading company and bank in Zurich
- Heinrich Pestalozzi (1790–1857), Swiss engineer, cartographer, and politician
- Hans Jakob Pestalozzi (1801–1874), Swiss lawyer and politician
- Karl Pestalozzi (1825–1891), Swiss civil engineer and professor
- Friedrich Otto Pestalozzi (1846–1940), Swiss businessman, politician, publisher, and conservative activist
- Hans Konrad Pestalozzi (1848–1909), a Swiss architect and politician
- Emil Pestalozzi (1852–1929), Swiss physician and prominent Catholic activist
- Max Pestalozzi (1857–1925), Swiss chess master
- Adèle Pestalozzi (1864–1933), Swiss Catholic women's rights activist and educator
- Friedrich Pestalozzi (1871–1933), Swiss agriculturalist and politician
- Regula Pestalozzi (1921–2000), Swiss lawyer and politician
- Hans A. Pestalozzi (1929–2004), Swiss social critic
- Karl Pestalozzi (1929–2023), Swiss literary scholar and professor of German literature

=== Companies & institutions related to the family ===
- Colegio Pestalozzi, Argentina
- Colegio Pestalozzi, Peru
- Kinderdorf Pestalozzi, Switzerland
- Pestalozzi AG, Switzerland
- Pestalozzi-Gymnasium Biberach, Germany
- Pestalozzi-Stiftung Hamburg, Germany
- Pestalozzianum, Switzerland
- Pestalozzi International Village, United Kingdom
- Neuhof, Switzerland

== Bibliography ==
- Almanach généalogique suisse, vol. 1, 1905, pp. 381-389; vol. 4, 1913, pp. 414-424; vol. 7, 1943, pp. 379-393.
- Corrodi-Sulzer, Adrian: «Das Haus "zum Brünneli" an der Froschaugasse. Stammhaus der Zürcher Pestalozzi», in: Zürcher Taschenbuch, 57, 1936, pp. 28-44.
- Pestalozzi-Keyser, Hans: Geschichte der Familie Pestalozzi, 1958.
- Arnet, Helene: «Die Suche nach dem Zürcher Adel», in: Tages-Anzeiger, 27.12.2013
