= Heinrich Pestalozzi (civil engineer) =

Swiss engineer and cartographer (1790–1857)

- Born: September 25, 1790; Zurich, Switzerland
- Died: August 9, 1857 (aged 66); Zurich, Switzerland
- Occupations: Engineer, cartographer, politician
- Known for: Topographic mapping, hydraulic engineering, founding the Swiss Society of Engineers and Architects
- Parent(s): Hans Jakob Pestalozzi; Anna Cleophea Lochmann
- Relatives: Hans Conrad Lochmann (grandfather)

Heinrich Pestalozzi (25 September 1790 – 9 August 1857) was a Swiss engineer, cartographer, and politician from Zurich. He played a significant role in the development of Switzerland's infrastructure during the 19th century, particularly in hydraulic engineering and road construction. Pestalozzi was a founding member and first president of the Swiss Society of Engineers and Architects in 1837.

== Early life and education ==
Heinrich Pestalozzi was born on 25 September 1790 in Zurich to Hans Jakob Pestalozzi and Anna Cleophea Lochmann. He was the grandson of Hans Conrad Lochmann and remained celibate throughout his life. After attending art school in Zurich, Pestalozzi completed an apprenticeship with engineer Johannes Feer. He subsequently trained as a cartographer under quartermaster general Hans Conrad Finsler and studied hydraulic construction with Hans Conrad Escher de la Linth.

== Career ==
From 1823, Pestalozzi served as a deputy in the Grand Council of Zurich and held the position of superintendent of the city's fortifications.

Between 1832 and 1857, Pestalozzi served as cantonal inspector of roads and hydraulic constructions for Zurich. He oversaw major infrastructure projects that were crucial to the canton's modernization. From 1853 to 1857, he was also a member of the management board of the Northeastern Railway.

As an expert in water management, Pestalozzi contributed to the correction of waters in the Jura region and the Reuss River. From 1839, he chaired the commission responsible for creating a topographic map of the Canton of Zurich, known as the Wild map.

In 1837, he became the founding president of the Swiss Society of Engineers and Architects, an organization that played a crucial role in professionalizing engineering practice in the country. He was also a member of the Military Mathematics Society of Zurich.

His contributions to engineering and public service were recognized with the gold medal of merit from the city of Zurich. In the military, he achieved the rank of colonel in the corps of engineers.

Pestalozzi authored numerous hydrographic works that contributed to the understanding and management of Switzerland's water resources. His expertise in hydraulic engineering was particularly valuable during an era when Switzerland was developing its modern infrastructure and transportation networks.

== Death ==
Heinrich Pestalozzi died on 9 August 1857 in Zurich at the age of 66.

== See also ==
- Pestalozzi family

== Bibliography ==
- Pestalozzi-Keyser, Hans: Geschichte der Familie Pestalozzi, 1958.
- Speich, Daniel: Herren über wildes Wasser. Die Linthingenieure als Bundesexperten im 19. Jahrhundert, 2006, pp. 45–50 (Schweizer Pioniere der Wirtschaft und Technik, 82).
