= Hans Jakob Pestalozzi (merchant) =

Swiss politician and merchant (1749-1831)

- Born: October 8, 1749; Zurich, Old Swiss Confederacy
- Died: October 8, 1831 (aged 82); Zurich, Switzerland
- Occupations: Merchant, politician
- Spouse(s): Anna Barbara Escher vom Glas (m. 1774) Anna Cleophea Lochmann (m. 1782)
- Parent(s): Johann Heinrich Pestalozzi; Regula von Orelli

Hans Jakob Pestalozzi (8 October 1749 – 8 October 1831) was a Swiss merchant and politician from Zurich. He played an important role in Zurich politics between 1790 and 1831, contributing to the preservation of the state during times of crisis. His political career spanned the upheavals of the Ancien Régime, the Helvetic Republic, the Act of Mediation, and the Restoration.

== Early life and family ==
Hans Jakob Pestalozzi was born on 8 October 1749 in Zurich to Johann Heinrich Pestalozzi, a silk merchant, and Regula von Orelli. He was Protestant and belonged to the Pestalozzi family of Zurich.

He married twice: first in 1774 to Anna Barbara Escher vom Glas, daughter of Hans Conrad Escher vom Glas, a guild provost, and second in 1782 to Anna Cleophea Lochmann, daughter of Hans Conrad Lochmann and Esther Escher vom Glas.

== Education and commercial career ==
After attending the gymnasium in Zurich, Pestalozzi trained in commerce in Lyon and Bergamo from 1770 to 1773. Until 1788, he worked as a partner and merchant in the silk trade business of his brother Johann Konrad Pestalozzi, operating between Zurich and Bergamo.

== Political career ==
Pestalozzi began his political career in 1788 when he was elected to the Small Council (Kleiner Rat) of Zurich, serving until 1798. During the Helvetic Republic, he served on the provisional municipality from 1798 to 1799. In 1799, he was deported to Basel, but subsequently became president of the revenue chamber (Kammer der Regie) of the city of Zurich from 1799 to 1802 and a member of the Administrative Chamber of the canton from 1801 to 1803.

Between 1803 and 1831, Pestalozzi held two key positions in the cantonal government: president of the finance commission and member of the diplomatic commission, which was renamed Staatsrat (foreign affairs) in 1815. He served multiple times as a delegate to the Federal Diet.

A moderate conservative, Pestalozzi was described as cultivated and prudent.

== Death ==
Hans Jakob Pestalozzi died on 8 October 1831 in Zurich, at 82 years old.

== Bibliography ==
=== Works ===
- Pestalozzi, Rudolf (ed.): Die Tagebücher des Ratsherrn Hans Jacob Pestalozzi, 1792-1798, 1954.

=== Archive collections ===
- Zentralbibliothek Zürich, Zurich, Bestand Johann Jakob Pestalozzi.

=== Secondary sources ===
- Pestalozzi-Keyser, Hans: Geschichte der Familie Pestalozzi, 1958, pp. 132-140.
- Schmid, Stefan G.: Die Zürcher Kantonsregierung seit 1803, 2003, p. 322.
