= Zauber-Bibliothek =

German work on demonology and witchcraft

The Zauber-Bibliothek ("Magic Library") is a work by the German Protestant theologian, preacher, and writer Georg Conrad Horst (1767 or 1769–1832), bearing the title “Großherzoglich-Hessischer Kirchenrat” (Church Councillor of the Grand Duchy of Hesse), which was published in six volumes between 1821 and 1826 in Mainz by Florian Kupferberg.

It is a compendium on demonology and witchcraft in which hundreds of manuscripts and books on all kinds of superstition, witchcraft, and magic were utilized. It contains extensive source material to promote a purely historical assessment of these subjects, free from superstition and disbelief, as his subtitle say.

Its full German title is Zauber-Bibliothek oder von Zauberei, Theurgie und Mantik, Zauberern, Hexen, und Hexenprocessen, und Geistererscheinungen. Zur Beförderung einer rein-geschichtlichen, von Aberglauben und Unglauben freien Beurtheilung dieser Gegenstände; roughly translated: Magic Library, or On Magic, Theurgy and Mantics, Magicians, Witches, and Witch Trials, and Apparitions of Spirits. For the Promotion of a Purely Historical Assessment of These Subjects, Free from Superstition and Disbelief).

In his work the author presented a partially annotated anthology of old manuscripts and records dealing with magic, demonic evocations, magical writings, witch trials, spirit apparitions, and vampirism. Included among other things is “Faust’s Triple Hellish Compulsion”.

Georg Conrad Horst is also the author of other works on magic and occultism; however, his extensive Zauber-Bibliothek is particularly noteworthy. This was preceded by his book Theurgie, oder vom Bestreben der Menschen in der alten und neuen Zeit, zwischen sich und der Geisterwelt eine unmittelbare reale Verbindung zu bewirken ("Theurgy, or on the human endeavor in ancient and modern times to establish a direct, real connection between themselves and the spirit world.") (Mainz, Florian Kupferberg, 1820), the first edition of which appeared before the complete work of the Zauber-Bibliothek.

The Danish psychologist Alfred Lehmann (1858–1921) judged the Zauber-Bibliothek as follows:

Da ein Verständnis des Aberglaubens vor allen Dingen erfordert, dass man die abergläubische Vorstellung selber kennt, so haben solche Sammlungen des Materials einen keineswegs geringen wissenschaftlichen Wert. Das grösste Verdienst in dieser Beziehung hat sich der Prediger Georg Conrad Horst (1767-1838) erworben.

(in English translation)

Since an understanding of superstition above all requires that one is familiar with the superstitious ideas themselves, such collections of material have by no means insignificant scholarly value. The greatest merit in this respect has been earned by the preacher Georg Conrad Horst (1767–1838).

Otto Stoll for example used the work for his Suggestion und Hypnotismus in der Völkerpsychologie (Suggestion and Hypnotism in Folk Psychology).

== See also ==
- Georg Conrad Horst (in German)

== Bibliography ==
- Georg Conrad Horst: Zauber-Bibliothek oder von Zauberei, Theurgie und Mantik, Zauberern, Hexen, und Hexenprocessen, und Geistererscheinungen. Zur Beförderung einer rein-geschichtlichen, von Aberglauben und Unglauben freien Beurtheilung dieser Gegenstände. Mainz, bei Florian Kupferberg, 1821–1826 (6 vols.) copies
- Georg Conrad Horst: Zauber-Bibliothek oder von Zauberei, Theurgie und Mantik, Zauberern, Hexen und Hexenprocessen, Dämonen, Gespenstern und Geistererscheinungen. With an introduction by Herbert Kempf. 7 volumes (complete). Freiburg, Aurum (Edition Ambra), 1979, vol. 7 index volume (Bibliotheca Mystica et Occulta – reprint of the Mainz 1821–1826 edition)
- Georg Conrad Horst: Theurgie, oder vom Bestreben der Menschen in der alten und neuen Zeit, zwischen sich und der Geisterwelt eine unmittelbare reale Verbindung zu bewirken. Mainz, Florian Kupferberg, 1820
