= William Frederick Mayers =

British sinologist (1831–1878)

William S. Frederick Mayers (7 January 1831 – 1878) was a British diplomat, numismatist, writer, and sinologist. He served as vice-consul in China and wrote extensively on the region. He was a Fellow of the Royal Geographical Society from 1861.

== Biography ==
Mayers was born in Tasmania, the son of the Rev. Michael John Mayers, then a chaplain there. His father became consular chaplain at Marseille in 1840 and Mayers received most of his schooling there.

He spent some years as a journalist in New York writing for the Atlantic Monthly (1858—9) including on political matters such as on Venezuela after he came to know of José Antonio Paez, then in exile in New York. In 1859, Mayers joined the British Foreign Office and went to China as a student-interpreter, accompanying Lord Elgin to Beijing. After serving as interpreter to the allied commission charged with the government of Canton, he was appointed interpreter to the consulate there. He encountered Gustaaf Schlegel there in 1861. In 1864, he was at Shanghai, assisting with Harry Smith Parkes the Bakufu officials Moriyama Takichirō and Yamaguchi Shichijirō.

Mayers filled consular posts at Chinese ports until 1872, when he was appointed Chinese secretary of the legation at Pekin. In the same year, he visited England, and in August read a paper on the Pathays of Yünan before the geographical section of the British Association at Brighton.

Mayers in 1861 became a fellow of the Royal Geographical Society; he was also a member of the Royal Asiatic Society,

He died on 24 March 1878 in Shanghai of typhus fever and was survived by his wife.

== Career ==
Mayers was a noted Chinese scholar. He wrote:

- The Anglo-Chinese Calendar Manual, 1869.
- The Chinese Reader's Manual, London 1874.
- Treaties between the Empire of China and Foreign Powers, 1877.
- The Chinese Government, Shanghai, 1878.

He collaborated with Henry Fletcher Hance, as a sinologist and botanist.

In 1867, with Nicholas Belfield Dennys and Lieutenant Charles King, Mayers wrote The Treaty Ports of China, and in 1877 translated the Peking Gazette for that year. His official report on The Famine in the Northern Provinces of China was published as a parliamentary paper. He was a contributor to periodical publications, especially the China Review, published in Shanghai, He published in 1869 in the Journal of the Royal Asiatic Society a paper on the Lamaist Septem in Tibet.
