= Adèle Pestalozzi =

Swiss Catholic women's rights activist and educator (1864-1933)

- Born: Maria Mathilde Adelheid Georgia Pfyffer von Altishofen; October 7, 1864; Lucerne, Switzerland
- Died: February 14, 1933 (aged 68); Lucerne, Switzerland
- Occupation(s): Educator, women's rights activist
- Spouse: Emil Pestalozzi (m. 1883)
- Parent(s): Max Alphons Pfyffer von Altishofen; Mathilde Segesser

Adèle Pestalozzi (born Maria Mathilde Adelheid Georgia Pfyffer von Altishofen; 7 October 1864 – 14 February 1933) was a Swiss Catholic women's rights activist and educator. She was one of the founding members of the Swiss Catholic Women's League in 1912 and played a significant role in establishing social-charitable education for women in Switzerland.

== Early life and education ==
Adèle Pestalozzi was born on 7 October 1864 in Lucerne to Max Alphons Pfyffer von Altishofen and Mathilde née Segesser. She belonged to the prominent Pfyffer von Altishofen family and was of Catholic faith. After completing her schooling in Lucerne, she pursued teacher training in France, preparing for a career in education.

== Marriage and family ==
In 1883, Adèle married Emil Pestalozzi, son of Heinrich Pestalozzi, a silk merchant, and Anna née Bodmer. Through this marriage, she became connected to the Pestalozzi family of Zurich. In 1910, she moved with her family to Zug, where she would establish herself as a prominent figure in Catholic women's organizations.

== Career and activism ==
In 1912, Adèle Pestalozzi was among the founders of the Swiss Catholic Women's League (Schweizerischer Katholischer Frauenbund), an organization dedicated to advancing the rights and interests of Catholic women in Switzerland. She served as vice-president of the organization from its founding until 1932, playing a crucial role in its development and activities over two decades.

Pestalozzi was also instrumental in establishing the social-charitable school for women founded in 1918 in Lucerne. This institution aimed to provide specialized education and training for women in social work and charitable activities. She served as a member of the school's commission from its establishment until 1932, contributing to the development of social education for women in Switzerland.

In recognition of her contributions to the Catholic Church and her work in women's organizations, Adèle Pestalozzi was awarded the Pro Ecclesia et Pontifice cross, a papal decoration honoring distinguished service to the Church.

== Death ==
Adèle Pestalozzi died on 14 February 1933 in Lucerne at the age of 68.

== Bibliography ==
- Staatsarchiv Luzern, Lucerne, Fonds Schweizerischer Katholischer Frauenbund SKF
- Die katholische Schweizerin, 1933, no 11
