= Karl Pestalozzi (civil engineer) =

Swiss civil engineer and professor (1825-1891)

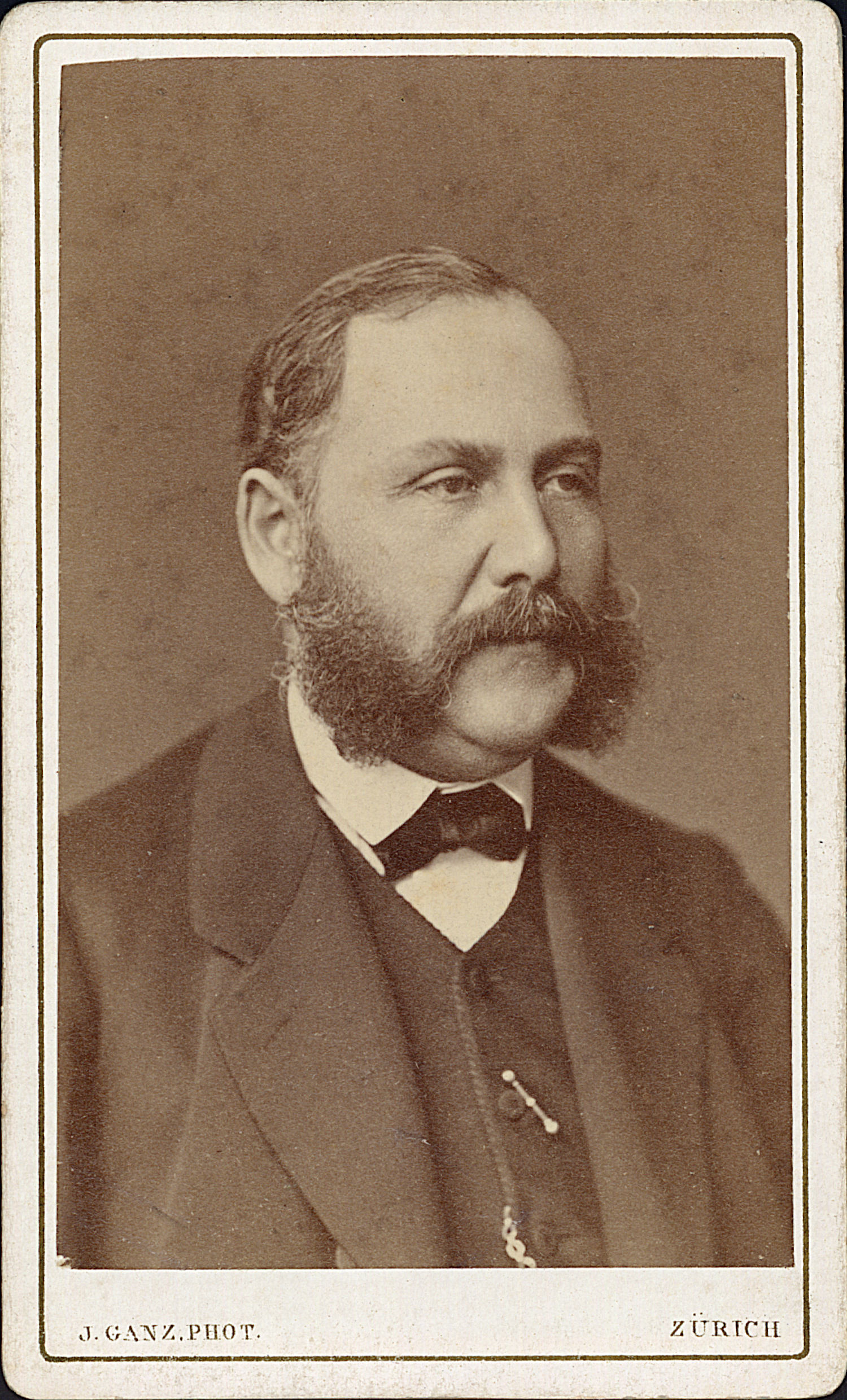
- Born: May 4, 1825; Neuhof, Switzerland
- Died: January 14, 1891 (aged 65); Zurich, Switzerland
- Education: Karlsruhe Institute of Technology, Vienna University of Technology
- Occupations: Civil engineer, Professor
- Known for: Hydraulic engineering, Rhine correction projects
- Parent(s): Gottlieb Pestalozzi (father); Katharina Schmid (mother)
- Relatives: Johann Heinrich Pestalozzi (great-great-grandfather)

Karl Pestalozzi (4 May 1825 – 14 January 1891) was a Swiss civil engineer and professor who made significant contributions to hydraulic engineering and topographic surveying in 19th-century Switzerland. He served as a professor at the ETH Zurich and was involved in river correction projects, including the Rhine correction and the regulation of Lake Geneva's outflow.

== Early life and education ==
Karl Pestalozzi was born on 4 May 1825 at the Neuhof in Switzerland, the son of Gottlieb Pestalozzi, a farmer, and Katharina née Schmid. He was the great-great-grandson of the educational reformer Johann Heinrich Pestalozzi of the Pestalozzi family. Pestalozzi was Protestant and held citizenship of Zurich.

After attending the cantonal school in Zurich, Pestalozzi pursued engineering studies at Karlsruhe and Vienna from 1840 to 1845. Under the direction of Johannes Wild, he participated in the surveys of the topographic map of the canton of Zurich.

== Career ==
Pestalozzi began his academic career at the Swiss Federal Institute of Technology in Zurich (ETH) in 1856 as an assistant teacher of engineering sciences. He was promoted to full professor in 1864, and in 1881, he succeeded Carl Culmann as ordinary professor of civil engineering, specializing in roads and hydraulic engineering. He held this position until his death in 1891.

He authored numerous expert reports on river development projects, notably contributing to the Rhine correction project and the regulation of Lake Geneva's outflow.

Pestalozzi was actively involved in public administration in Zurich. He served as a member of the public works commission of the city of Zurich from 1854 to 1883. From 1861 to 1865, he served as a municipal councillor responsible for public works.

Pestalozzi also served in the Grand Council of the city from 1865 to 1883. Additionally, he held the position of treasurer of the Pestalozzi Foundation. In military service, he achieved the rank of colonel in the artillery.

== Personal life and death ==
Karl Pestalozzi remained unmarried throughout his life. He died on 14 January 1891 in Zurich at the age of 65.

== Bibliography ==
- Revue polytechnique suisse, 17, 1891, pp. 19-21 (obituary).
- Pestalozzi-Keyser, Hans: Geschichte der Familie Pestalozzi, 1958, pp. 156-157.
- Vischer, Daniel L.: Wasserbauer und Hydrauliker der Schweiz. Kurzbiographien ausgewählter Persönlichkeiten, 2001, pp. 74-75.
