= Karl Pestalozzi (literary scholar) =

Swiss literary scholar and professor of German literature

- Born: March 14, 1929; Saint-Gall, Switzerland
- Died: July 31, 2023 (aged 94); Allschwil, Switzerland
- Education: University of Zurich, University of Tübingen
- Occupations: Literary scholar, Professor
- Known for: Research on Gottfried Keller, Friedrich Nietzsche, Hugo von Hofmannsthal
- Spouse: Julia Kerpel (m. 1967)

Karl Pestalozzi (14 March 1929 – 31 July 2023) was a Swiss literary scholar and professor of German literature. He served as rector of the University of Basel from 1990 to 1992 and was a prominent figure in German studies and Swiss literary criticism.

== Early life and education ==
Karl Pestalozzi was born on 14 March 1929 in Saint-Gall, Switzerland, to Richard Pestalozzi, a pastor from the Pestalozzi family, and Gertrud née Schlegel. He was Protestant and originally from Zurich. He was the great-great-grandson of Diethelm Georg Finsler.

Pestalozzi studied theology and German studies at the Universities of Zurich and Tübingen. He obtained his doctorate in 1958 under the supervision of Emil Staiger.

== Academic career ==
From 1959 to 1968, Pestalozzi worked as an assistant to Wilhelm Emrich at the Free University of Berlin. He received his habilitation in 1968, qualifying him for a professorship in German universities.

In 1968, Pestalozzi was appointed professor ordinarius of modern German literature at the University of Basel, a position he held until 1999. During his tenure at Basel, he served as dean of the Faculty of Arts from 1975 to 1976 and as rector of the university from 1990 to 1992.

Pestalozzi was the founding president of the foundation for the historical and critical edition of the works of Gottfried Keller from 1993 to 2014. He also served as president of the Nietzsche House foundation in Sils-Maria from 1994 to 2006.

== Research and methodology ==
Pestalozzi's research focused on several major figures and themes in German literature, including Hugo von Hofmannsthal, Gottfried Keller, Friedrich Nietzsche, and Johann Kaspar Lavater. He also studied fin de siècle literature, the history of German studies, and Swiss literature. His methodological approaches drew from the intellectual history work of his mentors Emil Staiger and Wilhelm Emrich.

Throughout his career, Pestalozzi served as a mediator between Swiss and West German literary criticism, both before and after the pivotal year of 1968.

== Personal life ==
In 1967, Pestalozzi married Julia Kerpel, a physician specializing in child and adolescent psychiatry.

Karl Pestalozzi died on 31 July 2023 in Allschwil, Switzerland, at the age of 94.

== Bibliography ==
Groddeck, Wolfram; Stadler, Ulrich (ed.): Physiognomie und Pathognomie. Zur literarischen Darstellung von Individualität. Festschrift für Karl Pestalozzi zum 65. Geburtstag, 1994 (with list of works)
