= Swiss Women's Association Liaison Centers =

Network of Swiss organizations coordinating women's associations

- Formation: 1914
- Type: Non-profit organization
- Purpose: Coordination of women's organizations, promotion of gender equality
- Location: Switzerland
- Members: 17 centers (as of 2019)
- Official language: German, French, Italian
- Main organ: Conference of Swiss Women's Association Liaison Centers

The Swiss Women's Association Liaison Centers (Note: German: Frauenzentralen; French: Centres de liaison des associations féminines; Italian: Federazioni delle associazioni femminili) are a network of private associations anchored in cities and cantons that coordinate local and regional women's organizations and facilitate exchanges and networking. Each center follows different thematic orientations and work axes, representing their interests to authorities and participating in the legislative process. The common objective, inscribed in their statutes, is women's equality in the workplace, society, and politics.

Within the framework of the conference of Swiss women's association liaison centers, cantonal centers meet regularly to stay informed about their activities and publish common position statements on issues of supra-regional importance. As of 2019, there were 17 liaison centers operating across Switzerland.

== History ==
=== Early origins and World War I ===
The first centers emerged in Zurich and St. Gallen at the beginning of World War I. During the first two years of the war, similar associations were founded in Basel and Winterthur. Initially known as Zentrale Frauenhilfe, their purpose was to organize volunteer work to address acute emergency situations resulting from mobilization and serve as contact points for civil assistance cases.

These organizations assumed activities that should have been those of state social policy and led to a rapprochement between feminists and authorities. The number of founding associations was significant – 25 in the canton of St. Gallen and 14 in the city of Zurich – demonstrating that women's organizations were not lacking. The objective of the women's mutual aid centers was to unite forces at the cantonal level.

Supra-regional groupings already existed, including the Swiss Society of Public Utility for women, the Alliance of Swiss Women's Societies (BSF/ASF), the Swiss Catholic Women's League, the Swiss Association for Women's Suffrage, the Swiss Women Workers' Union, the Alemannic Union of Women's Societies for Moral Uplift, and the Union of Friends of Young Women. However, the dominant position of national-level associations, between which confessional and political differences existed, hindered cooperation between local sections affiliated with them. In cities, however, bourgeois women's organizations and working women's associations often collaborated well in liaison centers, even though class oppositions at the national level proved increasingly difficult to overcome from 1912 onwards.

The scientific literature does not reduce the foundation of women's mutual aid centers solely to emergency relief duties generated by the declaration of war. Their creation, considered primarily as an initiative of the BSF and suffrage associations and attributed to the progressive wing of the women's movement, is explained by two factors. On one hand, women could link their wartime engagement to demands for social and political equality. On the other hand, progressive associations lacked the infrastructure for relief operations that public utility women's societies possessed, notably schools, hospitals, and contacts with authorities.

=== Interwar developments ===
In St. Gallen, the Zentrale Frauenhilfe succeeded in bringing together representatives of Catholic and public utility associations as well as working women's associations. Until 1916, association delegates were linked only by a common secretariat. In anticipation of introducing women's suffrage in parishes, the coalition of women's organizations was constituted as a liaison center at the end of 1919 and affiliated with the BSF.

In Zurich, the Catholic Women's League joined the liaison center in 1920, which had emerged in 1916 from the women's mutual aid center, while socialist women joined after World War II. The liaison centers of St. Gallen and Zurich were primarily active in assistance tasks, a domain in which the Zurich center had already shown solidarity with working women during the 1918 Swiss general strike, which led them, through workers' demands, to women's suffrage.

In contrast, the Bern liaison center, founded in winter 1919-1920 under the name Berner Frauenbund had linked its activities with women's suffrage from the beginning, as the preconditions for its introduction at the cantonal level were more favorable there.

Under pressure from the economic crisis and spiritual defense, liaison centers moved away from their demands for political equality in the name of national cohesion from the 1930s onwards. They concentrated thereafter on their aid and assistance activities, as well as their social engagement in the fields of education and legal and professional counseling.

=== French-speaking Switzerland ===
In the Protestant cantons of French-speaking Switzerland, liaison centers emerged later from the regrouping of women's unions, apolitical and confessionally neutral organizations created from the end of the 19th century based on an American model. These fought against prostitution (moral uplift movement, abolitionism) and alcoholism (abstinence) and encouraged domestic education (home economics) and hygiene. Alongside these moral, social, and practical goals, they also engaged in favor of women's civic education and advocated for political equality.

In Geneva, the Women's Union, founded in 1891, united with other associations to form the Geneva Women's Association Liaison Center in 1937. In the Canton of Vaud, women's unions emerged notably in Lausanne (1896), Vevey (1903), Morges (1904), Nyon (1905), Château-d'Œx (1905), and Moudon (1908). Initially grouped under the aegis of the Vaud Canton Women's Union, they subsequently affiliated with the Vaud Women's Societies Cartel (1934) then with the Vaud Women's Association Liaison Center founded in 1961.

In the Canton of Neuchâtel, women's organizations created among others in Neuchâtel (1905) and Le Locle (1921) constituted the cantonal liaison center in 1945.

=== Post-1945 expansion ===
After 1945, liaison centers expanded their counseling services (law, budget, pension planning, child support recovery, sexuality and pregnancy, etc.). Additionally, new areas of activity emerged, notably the rationalization and professionalization of domestic work, consumer protection, women's work in general, and the reconciliation of professional and family life in particular. Engagement in favor of political equality also returned to the forefront.

During the Cold War, liaison centers displayed resolutely anti-communist positions. Thereafter, they largely abandoned the pioneering role of progressive, non-partisan, and supra-confessional social policy they had assumed during the interwar period.

=== Ticino and Catholic cantons ===
In the mid-1950s, demand for a politically and confessionally neutral umbrella organization became clearly felt in Ticino. In 1957, Denise Berthoud, president of the BSF, called for the creation of such an organization for Italian-speaking Switzerland during preparations for the BSF's annual assembly to be held in Ticino. Her proposal met with favorable response, accentuated by opposition to the Federal Council's proposal to introduce compulsory civil service for women. Its rejection by the people on March 3, 1957, reinforced feelings of solidarity among women.

In April, representatives of 12 women's associations founded the Federazione ticinese delle Società femminili (FTFS), renamed Federazione delle Associazioni femminili Ticino (FAFT) in 2001. Its main objective was the introduction of women's suffrage. The first members belonged essentially to the bourgeoisie. They benefited from good education, were situated in the center of the political spectrum, and resided in the Sottoceneri.

In the Catholic cantons of western Switzerland, cantonal liaison centers were only founded in the second half of the 20th century (Fribourg in 1973, Jura in 1983, and Valais in 1984).

== Organization and activities ==
The liaison centers operate as private associations that coordinate women's organizations at local and regional levels. Each center follows distinct thematic orientations and work approaches while sharing the common statutory objective of promoting women's equality in work, society, and politics. They represent their members' interests before authorities and participate in legislative processes.

Through the conference of Swiss women's association liaison centers, the cantonal centers maintain regular contact to share information about their activities and coordinate positions on matters of broader significance. This coordination allows them to present unified stances on issues affecting women across different regions and linguistic communities of Switzerland.

== Bibliography ==
- Schweizerischer Frauenkalender, 1911-1964.
- Mesmer, Beatrix: «Jubiläen und Geschichtsbilder. Einige Bemerkungen zur Selbstdarstellung der Frauenzentralen», in: Belser, Katharina; Ryter, Elisabeth et al. (éd.): Solidarität, Streit, Widerspruch. Festschrift für Judith Jánoska, 1991, pp. 41-52.
- Castelletti, Susanna; Fornara, Lisa: Donne in movimento. Storia della Federazione Associazioni Femminili Ticino 1957-2007, 2007.
- Mesmer, Beatrix: Staatsbürgerinnen ohne Stimmrecht. Die Politik der schweizerischen Frauenverbände 1914-1971, 2007.
- Ruckstuhl, Brigitte; Ryter, Elisabeth: Beraten, bewegen, bewirken. Zürcher Frauenzentrale 1914-2014, 2014.
- Ruckstuhl, Brigitte; Ryter, Elisabeth: «100 Jahre soziales Engagement – 100 Jahre Frauenzentrale Bern», in: Berner Zeitschrift für Geschichte, 81, 2019/4, pp. 3-39.
