= Regula Pestalozzi =

Swiss lawyer and politician (1921–2000)

- Born: Regula Henggeler; 1 November 1921; Zurich, Switzerland
- Died: 15 July 2000 (aged 78); Zurich, Switzerland
- Education: University of Zurich; University of Geneva
- Occupations: Lawyer, politician
- Political party: Radical-Democratic Party
- Spouse: Anton Pestalozzi (m. 1944)
- Parent(s): Josef Henggeler (father); Emma Mölich (mother)

Regula Pestalozzi (née Henggeler; 1 November 1921 – 15 July 2000) was a Swiss lawyer and politician who played a significant role in women's rights advocacy and local politics in Zurich. She served in the Zurich cantonal council from 1971 to 1975, and as a member of the Zurich city executive from 1974 to 1978.

== Early life and education ==
Regula Pestalozzi was born on 1 November 1921 in Zurich to Josef Henggeler, a lawyer, and Emma Mölich, also a lawyer. She was Protestant and held citizenship of Zurich. After studying law at the University of Zurich and the University of Geneva, she obtained her doctorate in 1948 and qualified as a lawyer in 1959. In 1944, she married Anton Pestalozzi, a lawyer, and subsequently opened a law practice with her husband.

== Legal and advocacy work ==
Pestalozzi became actively involved in women's rights organizations early in her career. She served as president of the legal commission of the Swiss Women's Association Liaison Center in Zurich from 1967 to 1970. Her involvement in women's advocacy expanded when she became a member of the committee of the Bund Schweizerischer Frauenvereine from 1968 to 1979, serving as its president from 1971 to 1974. In this capacity, she represented the organization in various federal commissions. She also served on the committee of the Federation of Swiss Protestant Churches from 1978 to 1987.

== Political career ==
Pestalozzi joined the leadership of the Zurich Radical-Democratic Party in 1970. She was elected to the Zurich cantonal council and served from 1971 to 1975. In 1974, she was elected to the executive council of the city of Zurich, where she held the portfolios for Health and Economy until 1978.

She was heavily criticized in 1975 when she filed a complaint against the head physician of the medical department of the Triemli Hospital, Urs Peter Haemmerli, accused of euthanasia.

== Later career and death ==
Following her defeat in the 1978 elections, Pestalozzi returned to practicing law. She died on 15 July 2000 in Zurich.
