= Friedrich Otto Pestalozzi =

Swiss businessman, politician, and conservative activist (1846-1940)

- Born: November 2, 1846; Zurich, Switzerland
- Died: January 12, 1940 (aged 93); Zurich, Switzerland
- Occupations: Businessman, politician, journalist, editor
- Spouse: Regula Anna Junghans (m. 1878)
- Parent(s): Rudolf Alexander Pestalozzi; Emilie Wiser

Friedrich Otto Pestalozzi (2 November 1846 – 12 January 1940) was a Swiss businessman, politician, and conservative activist from Zurich. A prominent figure in Zurich's conservative Protestant circles, he served in both city and cantonal legislatures and was instrumental in founding several conservative organizations and publications. Pestalozzi became known as an embodiment of the ideals of the "Old Zurich" nostalgic movement.

== Early life and education ==
Friedrich Otto Pestalozzi was born on 2 November 1846 in Zurich to Rudolf Alexander Pestalozzi, an iron merchant, and Emilie née Wiser. He was a Protestant and a citizen of Zurich. Pestalozzi attended the gymnasium, industrial school, and received commercial training in Zurich. After completing his education, he spent four years in England (1867-1871) working in the company of the Swiss consul general.

== Business career ==
Upon returning to Switzerland in 1871, Pestalozzi joined his father's iron trading business as a collaborator. He became a partner in the firm Pestalozzi from 1878 to 1921.

== Political career ==
Pestalozzi served as the Belgian consul in Zurich from 1878 to 1887. He was also active in politics at both municipal and cantonal levels. He served in the Zurich city legislature from 1879 to 1897 and in the Grand Council of Zurich from 1883 to 1918. As a spokesperson for conservatives, he was welcomed into the liberal and later radical electoral lists and groups.

In 1865, Pestalozzi joined the Gesellschaft vom alten Zürich (Society of Old Zurich), a nostalgic and traditionalist movement. He was among the founders in 1875 of the Eidgenössischer Verein, an association emerging from Protestant and conservative circles that campaigned during federal voting campaigns.

== Publishing and journalism ==
Pestalozzi was heavily involved in conservative journalism and publishing. He contributed to various conservative newspapers, notably as a correspondent for the Allgemeine Schweizer Zeitung of Basel and as editor of the free newspaper Schweizerblätter from 1883 to 1916. In 1878, he was one of the initiators of a new edition of the Zürcher Taschenbuch, serving as its editor until 1882. In 1889, with the support of sympathizers, he purchased the Zürcherische Freitagszeitung.

He was also one of the promoters of the Schweizerisches Künstler-Lexikon (Swiss Artists' Lexicon) in 1898, directing it until 1918. This work aimed to document Swiss artists and their contributions to the cultural landscape.

== Cultural and social activities ==
Pestalozzi served as president of the Zurich Artists' Society from 1888 to 1895. He was deeply engaged in various social works of the Evangelical Society. As former president of the Fraumünster parish council, he headed the church renovation commission in 1910-1911.

== Personal life and death ==
In 1878, Pestalozzi married his cousin Regula Anna Junghans from Schramberg in the Black Forest. He died on 12 January 1940 in Zurich at the age of 93.

== Recognition ==
In 1916, the University of Zurich awarded Pestalozzi an honorary doctorate in recognition of his contributions to Swiss cultural and historical preservation.

== Bibliography ==
- Eidenbenz-Pestalozzi, Emil: Friedrich Otto Pestalozzi, 1846-1940, 1952 (Neujahrsblatt zum Besten des Waisenhauses Zürich, 115).
- Pestalozzi-Keyser, Hans: Geschichte der Familie Pestalozzi, 1958, pp. 161-163.
- "Dr. phil. h.c. Friedrich Otto Pestalozzi. 2. November 1846 bis 12. Januar 1940", in: Zürcher Taschenbuch auf das Jahr 1941, 1940, pp. 16-26.
