= Swiss Catholic Popular Association =

Swiss Catholic umbrella organization founded in 1904

- Schweizerischer Katholischer Volksverein Association populaire catholique suisse Unione popolare cattolica svizzera
- Predecessor: Piusverein, Swiss Catholic Association
- Formation: 1904
- Dissolved: 1991 (transformed into support association)
- Type: Religious association
- Purpose: Catholic education and cultural work
- Region served: Switzerland
- Official language: German, French, Italian

The Swiss Catholic Popular Association (SKVV) (Note: German: Schweizerischer Katholischer Volksverein, SKVV; French: Association populaire catholique suisse; Italian: Unione popolare cattolica svizzera) was a Swiss Catholic umbrella organization founded in 1904 as part of modernization efforts within Catholic organizations. The association served as the primary Catholic federation in Switzerland until its transformation into a support association in 1991.

== History ==
The SKVV was established in 1904 through the merger of three existing Catholic organizations

- the Swiss Catholic Association (successor to the Piusverein)
- the Federation of Catholic Workers' Circles and Men's Societies of German-speaking Switzerland
- the Federation of Catholic Circles and Societies of French-speaking Switzerland

The foundation was prompted by modernization attempts within Catholic organizations, with the first Swiss Catholic Day in 1903 in Lucerne and an article by Hans von Matt published in the Vaterland on April 12-13, 1904, serving as catalysts for this transformation.

The association was structured through local and cantonal sections and functioned as the umbrella organization for Swiss Catholics. Its primary mission encompassed religious and cultural education while serving as a connecting link for Catholics in Protestant cantons.

Between 1903 and 1954, the SKVV organized ten Swiss Catholic Days, which became the most significant public demonstrations of Swiss Catholic unity. These large-scale gatherings served as important platforms for Catholic expression and community building across linguistic and regional boundaries.

Between 1920 and 1950, the SKVV and the Conservative People's Party, founded in 1912, served as the twin pillars of political and social Catholicism in Switzerland. This period marked the height of the association's influence in Swiss Catholic life and its role in shaping Catholic political engagement.

== Relationship with church hierarchy ==
The Catholic episcopate maintained a reserved stance toward the SKVV for an extended period. Both the association and the organization of Catholic Days remained independent of ecclesiastical hierarchy until the 1930s, when they were finally brought under church authority following the emergence of Catholic Action. This integration represented a significant shift in the relationship between lay Catholic organizations and official church structure.

== Transformation ==
Initially restricted to male membership only, the association's gender limitations led to the establishment of the Swiss Catholic Women's League in 1912, aimed at reaching the entire Catholic population. The same year marked significant organizational changes as the SKVV strengthened its ties with Christian social organizations while severing its connections with the Swiss Workers' Federation.

From the late 1950s onward, the distinctive character of Catholic society began to diminish. At the local level, pastoral councils and parish councils increasingly displaced traditional associations. At cantonal, diocesan, and national levels, working communities and the Swiss Conference of Bishops assumed many of the functions previously fulfilled by the SKVV and its members. Catholic associations evolved differently depending on the linguistic region. In French-speaking Switzerland and Italian-speaking Switzerland, associations organized within the framework of Catholic Action, forming the Ticino Catholic Popular Association and the Romandy Community of Lay Apostolate. In German-speaking Switzerland and Romansh-speaking areas, the Working Community of Catholic Organizations was established. Youth organizations were unified in 1981 under the Swiss Association of Catholic Youth.

Within this transformed organizational landscape, the SKVV evolved into a support association in 1991, marking the end of its role as the primary umbrella organization for Swiss Catholics.

== Bibliography ==
- Altermatt, U. Der Weg der Schweizer Katholiken ins Ghetto, 1972 (3rd ed. 1995)
- Weibel, R. Schweizer Katholizismus heute, 1989
- Weibel, R. "Was hält den Schweizer Katholizismus zusammen?", in Herder-Korrespondenz, vol. 10, 1994
