= Marga Bührig =

Swiss feminist theologian (1915–2002)

- Born: 17 October 1915; Berlin, German Empire
- Died: 13 February 2002 (aged 86); Binningen, Basel-Landschaft, Switzerland
- Occupation: Theologian
- Parents: Wilhelm Bührig (father); Wanda von Weyssenhoff (mother)

Marga Bührig (17 October 1915 – 13 February 2002) was a German-born Swiss theologian and a leading representative of feminist theology. She directed the Protestant conference center Boldern from 1971 to 1981, was a member of the presidium of the World Council of Churches from 1983 to 1991, and was active in the peace movement and the new women's movement.

== Biography ==
Marga Bührig was born on 17 October 1915 in Berlin, the daughter of Wilhelm Bührig, an economist, and Wanda von Weyssenhoff, a writer. Born a German citizen, she became a Swiss citizen in 1934. She remained unmarried. She went to school in Chur and studied German studies at the University of Zurich, where she received her doctorate in 1939. She then studied theology while working as an assistant teacher at secondary schools (Mittelschulen).

In 1945 Bührig founded the Reformed house for women students (Reformiertes Studentinnenhaus) in Zurich. In 1946 she worked on the third Swiss Women's Congress, and in 1947 she co-founded the Protestant women's association (Evangelischer Frauenverein), after which she edited the magazine Die Evangelische Schweizerfrau. In 1958 she worked for the Swiss Exhibition for Women's Work (SAFFA), and from 1959 to 1964 she sat on the board of the Federation of Swiss Women's Organizations (Bund Schweizerischer Frauenorganisationen).

From 1959 Bührig worked at the Protestant conference center Boldern (Tagungszentrum Boldern), which she directed from 1971 to 1981. She took part in several world church conferences, and from 1983 to 1991 she was a member of the presidium of the World Council of Churches.

A leading representative of feminist theology, Bührig published numerous writings on religious and political subjects and was active in the peace movement and the new women's movement. In 1998 the Faculty of Protestant Theology of the University of Basel awarded her an honorary doctorate. She died in Binningen on 13 February 2002.

== Works ==
- Spät habe ich gelernt, gerne Frau zu sein, 1987

== Bibliography ==
- M. Strub-Jaccoud and H. Strub (eds.), Wegzeichen gelebten Evangeliums, 1985 (with a list of works)
- Sottosopra – die lustvolle Geschichte der weiblichen Freiheit (film), directed by G. Schärer, 2001
- Neue Zürcher Zeitung, 18 February 2002
