= Femmes protestantes =

Swiss Protestant women's organization founded in 1947

femmes protestantes
- Predecessor: Evangelische Frauen Schweiz
- Formation: 1947
- Founder: Marga Bührig
- Type: Non-profit organization
- Legal status: Active
- Purpose: Women's rights, social justice, religious advocacy
- Headquarters: Switzerland
- Members: 70,000 (2024)
- Official language: German, French
- President: Yvonne Feri
- Vice-President: Marie-Claude Ischer
- Website: femmesprotestantes.ch

femmes protestantes (formerly German: Evangelische Frauen Schweiz; French: Femmes protestantes en Suisse) is a Swiss Protestant women's organization founded in 1947. The organization emerged from earlier moral reform movements and has evolved into a progressive advocate for women's rights, social justice, and environmental protection. As of 2025, the organization represents approximately 70,000 members across Switzerland and operates as a bilingual national umbrella organization.

== History ==
=== Early origins ===
The organization's roots trace back to the Verband deutschschweizerischer Frauenvereine zur Hebung der Sittlichkeit (Association of German-Swiss Women's Clubs for the Elevation of Morality), founded in 1901 during the abolitionist movement. This association was primarily engaged in combating prostitution as part of the broader social purity movement. During the interwar period, the organization operated under the name Schweizerischer Verband Frauenhilfe (Swiss Association for Women's Aid) and focused on providing social services to at-risk women and youth.

The organization wielded considerable influence over federal and cantonal legislation, working to strengthen child protection laws and criminalize immoral behavior. Its numerous sections across German-speaking Switzerland made it a powerful force in Swiss politics and social reform.

=== Foundation of the EFS ===
Following the Third Swiss Women's Congress in 1946, the organization merged with other Protestant associations in 1947 to form the Evangelischer Frauenbund der Schweiz (French: Fédération suisse des femmes protestantes). This transformation was initiated by Marga Bührig, a journalist and theologian who had founded the Protestant Student House (Boldernhaus) in Zurich. Bührig served as editor of the organization's official publication, Die Evangelische Schweizerfrau (The Protestant Swiss Woman).

As a moral movement, the EFS aimed to have an educational impact and take positions on broader societal issues as part of the wider women's movement. The constituent associations within the EFS increasingly demonstrated social openness, ecumenism, anti-racism, pacifism, and demands for gender equality.

The influence of Marga Bührig was evident in the EFS's increasing engagement with feminist theology. This theological approach became a significant aspect of the organization's identity and advocacy work.

== Modern developments ==
In 2007, the organization was renamed Evangelische Frauen Schweiz (French: Femmes protestantes en Suisse) to reflect its evolving identity. Beyond equality issues, the organization consistently engaged against sexism and violence against women, and advocated for better social security for women in old age, particularly regarding pension rights.

Since the 2010s, unpaid care work has become a central focus of the EFS's advocacy, alongside international solidarity (including support for the Corporate Responsibility Initiative) and environmental and climate policy.

Under the presidency of Gabriela Allemann, a theologian and pastor who took office in 2019, the EFS participated in the 2019 women's strike in Switzerland. Like the 1991 strike, this event provided the organization with an opportunity to publicly demonstrate its solidarity with those particularly affected by discrimination and precarity.

For the 2021 Women's Session, the EFS collaborated with the Swiss Catholic Women's Federation to organize a commission for resident voting rights, aiming to guarantee political participation for all people regardless of their citizenship or residence status.

== Publications ==
The EFS has maintained several publications throughout its history:

- Die Evangelische Schweizerfrau - The organization's original official publication
- Schritte ins Offene (1971-2013) - A critical magazine published jointly with the Swiss Catholic Women's League
- Efs.Fps.Info (from 1991) - A bilingual publication launched independently by the EFS

== Bibliography ==
- Schnegg, Brigitte; Stalder, Anne-Marie: «Zur Geschichte der Schweizer Frauenbewegung», in: Die Stellung der Frau in der Schweiz. Bericht der Eidgenössischen Kommission für Frauenfragen, Bd. 4, 1984, S. 5-28.
- Bührig, Marga: Spät habe ich gelernt, gerne Frau zu sein. Eine feministische Autobiographie, 1987 (1999⁴).
- Viel erreicht – wenig verändert? Zur Situation der Frauen in der Schweiz. Bericht der Eidgenössischen Kommission für Frauenfragen, 1995.
- Müller, Verena E.: Frauen für Frauen – einst und jetzt. Schweizerische Evangelische Frauenhilfe – ein Kapitel Schweizer Geschichte, 2005.
- Helg, Barbara: Zwischen Evangelium und Politik. Zur Geschichte der Evangelischen Frauen Schweiz, 2011.
- Joris, Elisabeth; Witzig, Heidi: Frauengeschichten(n). Dokumente aus zwei Jahrhunderten zur Situation der Frauen in der Schweiz, 2021⁵ (1986), S. 469, 602.
