= Lina Beck-Meyenberger =

Swiss women's activist (1892–1988)

- Born: Lina Meyenberger; 30 November 1892; Wil, Switzerland
- Died: 21 April 1988 (aged 95); Sursee, Switzerland
- Occupation: Teacher
- Organization: Swiss Catholic Women's League
- Spouse: Julius Beck (m. 1916)
- Children: 2
- Parents: Johann Inocenz Meyenberger (father); Maria Lina Rubischum (mother)

Lina Beck-Meyenberger (born Lina Meyenberger; also Lina Beck; 30 November 1892 – 21 April 1988) was a Swiss teacher and women's activist. From 1941 to 1957 she was central president of the Swiss Catholic Women's League (SKF). From 1945 she gradually achieved the official recognition of the SKF at the federal level, initiated its cooperation with other women's organizations and pushed through a cautious opening on questions of gender equality.

== Biography ==
Lina Meyenberger was born on 30 November 1892 in Wil, the daughter of Johann Inocenz Meyenberger, a physician in Wil, and Maria Lina (née Rubischum). In 1916 she married Julius Beck. They had two daughters.

She attended the women teachers' college (Lehrerinnenseminar) in Menzingen, obtained teaching certificates from the cantons of Zug and St. Gallen, and worked as a private teacher in Athens. In 1940 she founded the Sursee welfare association (Surseer Fürsorgeverein). From 1941 to 1957 she was central president (Zentralpräsidentin) of the Swiss Catholic Women's League (Schweizerischer Katholischer Frauenbund, SKF). She was a member of the Swiss Commission for UNESCO.

From 1945 Beck-Meyenberger gradually achieved the official recognition of the SKF at the federal level, initiated its cooperation with other women's organizations and pushed through a cautious opening on questions of gender equality. She was an advocate of women's suffrage. She died on 21 April 1988 in Sursee.

== Bibliography ==
- C. Mutter, Frauenbild und politisches Bewusstsein im Schweizerischen Katholischen Frauenbund, licentiate thesis, Fribourg, 1987
