= Ulrich Lochmann =

Swiss officer and politician (1700–1777)

- Born: 29 January 1700
- Died: 4 September 1777 (aged 77)
- Spouses: Elisabeth Lochmann (m. 1725; died 1728) Regula Escher vom Glas (m. 1730; died 1755) Regula von Muralt (m. 1764; died 1775)
- Relatives: Hans Conrad Lochmann (nephew)
- Military career
- Allegiance: Republic of Venice (1716); Spain (1719–1721); Zurich; France (from 1752)
- Rank: Maréchal de camp
- Awards: Order of Military Merit (1770)

Ulrich Lochmann (29 January 1700 – 4 September 1777) was a Swiss officer and politician from Zurich. After serving as an officer in Venetian and Spanish service from 1716 to 1721, he was bailiff (Landvogt) of Wädenswil from 1736 to 1742 and a member of Zurich's Small Council from 1746 to 1751. From 1752 he was a colonel in French service, where he rose to maréchal de camp in 1761.

== Biography ==
Ulrich Lochmann was born on 29 January 1700, the son of Hans Heinrich Lochmann and Judith Erni. He married three times: in 1725 Elisabeth née Lochmann (died 1728), in 1730 Regula Escher vom Glas (died 1755), and in 1764 Regula von Muralt (died 1775). His nephew was Hans Conrad Lochmann.

In 1716 Lochmann became an ensign (Fähnrich) in Venetian service, and in 1719 a captain-lieutenant (Kapitänleutnant) in Spanish service. In 1721 he left the service and returned to Zurich.

In 1731 Lochmann became a member of the Grand Council of Zurich for the Kämbel guild. From 1736 to 1742 he was bailiff (Landvogt) of Wädenswil. In 1743 he became colonel of the Zurich troops, and from 1746 to 1751 he was a member of the Small Council (Kleinrat). In 1750 he was an envoy to the transalpine bailiwicks (ennetbirgische Vogteien).

In 1752 Lochmann became a colonel in French service, in 1758 a brigadier and in 1761 a maréchal de camp. In 1735 he had been admitted to the society of the Schildner zum Schneggen, and in 1770 he received the Order of Military Merit (pour le Mérite militaire). He died on 4 September 1777.

== Bibliography ==
- H. Schulthess, Die Lochmann, 1940, 19–25
