= Cleophea Pestalozzi =

Swiss businesswoman and silk merchant (1750–1820)

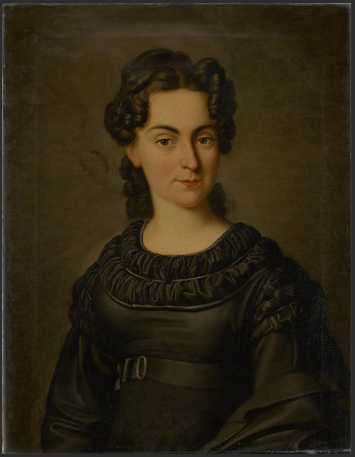
- Born: Cleophea von Orelli; September 1, 1750; Zurich, Old Swiss Confederacy
- Died: March 22, 1820 (aged 69); Zurich, Switzerland
- Occupation(s): Businesswoman, silk merchant, banker
- Spouse(s): Heinrich Escher vom Glas (m. 1776; died 1792) Hans Jakob Pestalozzi (m. 1796; died 1802)
- Parent(s): Hans Conrad von Orelli; Anna Lavater

Cleophea Pestalozzi (née von Orelli; 1 September 1750 – 22 March 1820) was a Swiss businesswoman who owned and directed a silk trading company and bank in Zurich, and a member of the prominent Pestalozzi family.

== Early life and marriages ==
Cleophea von Orelli was the daughter of Hans Conrad von Orelli, a merchant, and Anna Lavater. In 1776, she married Heinrich Escher vom Glas (1745–1792). Following his death, she married Hans Jakob Pestalozzi (1731–1802) in 1796. Hans Jakob was the son of Hans Jakob Pestalozzi and Ester Jonquière.

== Business career ==
When her second husband died childless in 1802, he bequeathed the Pestalozzi company at the Thalhof to Cleophea. She took over the silk trading and banking business, which had experienced difficulties during the revolutionary period, and successfully restored it to profitability.

Cleophea was assisted by Johannes Speerli from Kilchberg, who served as director. Already in 1802, she granted him a small share of the capital. In 1805, Speerli became her partner, entitled to one-third of the profits. Together, they changed the company's strategy, ending uncertain business dealings with France and focusing instead on Switzerland and Germany. Sales of moiré silk fabric, produced using new dyeing processes, increased in Southern Germany.

In 1808, Cleophea brought her nephews Hans Conrad (1784–1833) and Johann von Orelli (1785–1844) into the business as partners. However, they each received only one-sixth of the profits, while the remaining two-thirds went to Speerli and Cleophea Pestalozzi. She stepped down from management in 1812 but left her capital in the company at an interest rate of four percent. Speerli and the von Orelli brothers continued to manage the firm together.

== Bibliography ==
- Orelli von Reding, Eduard von: Orelli im Thalhof, 1787-1937, 1937.
- Pestalozzi-Keyser, Hans: Geschichte der Familie Pestalozzi, 1958.
- Peyer, Hans Conrad: Von Handel und Bank im alten Zürich, 1968.
