= Hans Jakob Pestalozzi (lawyer) =

19th-century Swiss lawyer and politician

- Born: August 3, 1801; Berlingen, Thurgau, Switzerland
- Died: June 5, 1874 (aged 72); Wädenswil, Zurich, Switzerland
- Education: University of Zurich, University of Göttingen
- Occupations: Lawyer, Politician
- Political party: Liberal
- Parent(s): Matthias Pestalozzi (father); Maria Magdalena Wegmann (mother)
- Relatives: Pestalozzi family

Hans Jakob Pestalozzi (3 August 1801 – 5 June 1874) was a Swiss lawyer and politician from the Canton of Zurich. He served as a member of the Grand Council of the canton of Zurich and as a Councillor of States during the mid-19th century, playing a role in Swiss liberalism and the establishment of the 1848 Swiss Federal Constitution.

== Early life and education ==
Hans Jakob Pestalozzi was born on 3 August 1801 in Berlingen, a municipality in the Canton of Thurgau. He was the son of Matthias Pestalozzi, a pastor and dean, and Maria Magdalena née Wegmann. He belonged to the prominent Pestalozzi family of Zurich and was Protestant. Pestalozzi remained unmarried throughout his life.

Initially instructed by his father, Pestalozzi later studied law at the University of Zurich. He completed his legal education by obtaining his doctorate at the University of Göttingen in 1824.

== Legal and political career ==
After completing his studies, Pestalozzi began his legal career as a prosecutor in 1825, followed by his admission to practice as a lawyer from 1828. He initially worked in Winterthur, before later establishing his practice in Wädenswil.

Pestalozzi became actively involved in liberal politics during the 1840s. In 1841, he presided over the popular assembly of Schwamendingen, which had been convened by the liberals. He also co-signed the call for the popular assembly of Unterstrass in 1845.

His political career included service as a member of the Grand Council of Zurich from 1843 to 1863. Subsequently, he was elected as a Councillor of States, representing Zurich from 1849 to 1863. During his tenure in the federal parliament, he aligned himself with the liberal faction associated with Alfred Escher. Pestalozzi maintained close ties with Jonas Furrer and actively supported the drafting and adoption of the 1848 Swiss Federal Constitution.

Beyond his legal and political activities, Pestalozzi contributed to educational governance in his region. He served on the school commission of the district of Winterthur and was a member of the school commission of the secondary school in Wädenswil from 1856 until his death in 1874.

== Death ==
Hans Jakob Pestalozzi died on 5 June 1874 in Wädenswil, at the age of 72.

== Bibliography ==
- Pestalozzi-Keyser, Hans: Geschichte der Familie Pestalozzi, 1958, pp. 147–150.
- Gruner, Erich (ed.): L'Assemblée fédérale suisse 1848-1920, vol. 1, 1966, p. 93.
