= Jean-François Barrière =

French historian (1786–1868)

Jean-François Barrière (12 May 1786 – 22 August 1868) was a French historian. He wrote about the French Revolution, most notably an annotated biography of Madame Roland entitled Memoirs de Madame Roland, Avec une Notice sur sa Vie, des Notes et des Eclaircissemens historiques par MM. Saint-Albin Berville et Jean-François Barrière, edited and published in 1827 by Honoré de Balzac.

Barrière served 18 years in the Préfecture of Paris, rising through the ranks to become division chief. He was removed from office and forced to retire following the Revolution of 1848.
