= Cotta'sche Bibliothek der Weltliteratur =

German book series

Cotta'sche Bibliothek der Weltliteratur ("Cotta's Library of World Literature") was a German book series with (mostly German) works in the ranking of "world literature", published by Cotta in Stuttgart. It was founded by Carl von Cotta and Adolf Kröner. From 1882 to 1909, 320 volumes were published.

It contained for example Goethes Sämtliche Werke (“Goethe’s Complete Works”) in 36 volumes, or the Complete Works by Arthur Schopenhauer with an introduction by Dr. Rudolf Steiner, or Heldensagen des Firdusi in deutscher Nachbildung (Heroic legends of Firdusi in German adaptation) in the translation by A. Fr. von Schack in 3 volumes.

== See also ==
- Cotta’sche Verlagsbuchhandlung (in German)

== Bibliography ==
- Dorothea Kuhn, Schiller-Nationalmuseum, Anneliese Kunz, Margot Pehle: Cotta und das 19. Jahrhundert aus der literarischen Arbeit eines Verlags. 1980
