= Emil Pestalozzi =

Swiss physician and activist (1852–1929)

- Born: July 18, 1852; Zurich, Switzerland
- Died: November 29, 1929 (aged 77); Zurich, Switzerland
- Education: University of Zurich, University of Würzburg
- Occupation: Physician
- Spouse: Adèle Pfyffer (m. 1883)
- Parent(s): Heinrich Pestalozzi, Anna Bodmer

Emil Pestalozzi (18 July 1852 – 29 November 1929) was a Swiss physician and prominent Catholic activist. Born into a Protestant family in Zurich, he converted to Catholicism in 1882, a decision that caused considerable controversy in Zurich at the time. Pestalozzi dedicated much of his career to advancing Catholic social work and missions in Switzerland, holding leadership positions in several Catholic organizations.

== Biography ==
=== Early life and education ===
Emil Pestalozzi was born on 18 July 1852 in Zurich to Heinrich Pestalozzi, a silk merchant, and Anna Bodmer. He belonged to the prominent Pestalozzi family of Zurich. Pestalozzi studied medicine at the University of Zurich from 1870 to 1875 and obtained his doctorate at the University of Würzburg in 1877.

=== Medical career ===
Following his doctoral studies, Pestalozzi pursued further medical training at hospitals in Vienna, Paris, and London. He established a medical practice in Zurich in 1879. After his conversion to Catholicism in 1882, Pestalozzi practiced medicine in Brunnen and Gersau from 1885 to 1887, before returning to Zurich in 1887. There he took over the health management of the Theodosianum, an institution he had helped found. In 1910, he relocated to Zug, where he continued his medical practice.

=== Religious conversion and activities ===
Pestalozzi's conversion from Protestantism to Catholicism in 1882 generated significant public attention and controversy in Zurich.

The following year, in 1883, he married Adèle Pfyffer, daughter of Max Alphons Pfyffer von Altishofen and Mathilde Segesser.

Following his conversion, Pestalozzi became deeply involved in Catholic organizations and social work. He worked extensively for the expansion of Catholic buildings and the development of Catholic missions and social works. His leadership roles included serving as president of several important Catholic organizations: Alt-Turicia in 1888, the Inner Mission and the Swiss Catholic Association in 1902, the Swiss Catholic Press League in 1916, and the Swiss Caritas Federation in 1925.

=== Death ===
Emil Pestalozzi died on 29 November 1929 in Zurich.

== Bibliography ==
- Schweizerische Kirchenzeitung, 49, 1929, pp. 414–415.
- Teobaldi, Alfred: Katholiken im Kanton Zürich. Ihr Weg zur öffentlich-rechtlichen Anerkennung, 1978, pp. 105–109.
- Brülisauer, Roland: Die inländische Mission 1863–1913. Katholische Diasporahilfe in der Schweiz, 1995.
- Alt-Turicia Zürich (ed.): Stolzes Banner am Limmatstrand. Die Geschichte der Akademischen Verbindung Turicia 1860–2013, 2014, p. 69.
