= Pestalozzi AG =

Swiss steel and iron trading company

- Company type: Private company
- Industry: Steel and iron trading, building services
- Founded: 1763
- Founder: Johann Heinrich Wiser
- Headquarters: Dietikon, Switzerland
- Key people: Matthias Pestalozzi (CEO)
- Revenue: CHF 235 million (2022)
- Number of employees: 400 (2022)
- Website: pestalozzi.com

Pestalozzi AG is a Swiss company active in steel and iron trading and building services, based in Dietikon. The company's origins date back to the 18th century, making it one of Switzerland's oldest family businesses, currently in its ninth generation of family ownership.

== Geographic presence ==
=== 18th and 19th centuries ===
Johann Heinrich Wiser was first mentioned in 1763 as an iron merchant in the Badergasse (now Zinnengasse 4) in Zurich. His son, Johann David Wiser, took over the business in 1788 and registered it in the commercial register in 1789. The same year, the company moved to the former ossuary of the Fraumünster, near the banks of the Limmat, where boats carrying steel and iron docked until the 20th century.

In 1835, Johann David Wiser acquired the Zur Farb building, located opposite the ossuary on the other side of the square at Münsterhof 12. Through additional real estate purchases in 1843, 1853, 1886, 1913, and 1918 (Münsterhof 10, 11 and In Gassen 1, 3, 5), the company formed a small "empire" in Zurich's old town. In 1850, Rudolf Alexander Pestalozzi-Wiser became the first member of the Pestalozzi family to join the company's management, representing the fourth generation of owners.

=== Early 20th century expansion ===
The fifth generation acquired land near Wollishofen station in 1893, as iron storage required increasingly more space. After installing a warehouse, a commercial building was constructed there in 1906. Fritz Burckhardt-Wiser joined the management in 1911, representing the sixth generation. With the arrival of the Basle Burckhardt family, the company's headquarters in Wollishofen was expanded.

=== Modern developments ===
When the warehouse became too small in the 1950s, the seventh generation of owners purchased land outside Zurich in Dietikon (locality called Silbern) in 1955 and built a steel reinforcement bending plant and six storage halls. In 1981, the company's headquarters (including the tools, machines, and machine tools sections) was also transferred to Dietikon, which was ideally connected to transportation routes after the construction of the motorway in 1971.

== Business activities ==
=== Historical products and services ===
From its beginnings, Pestalozzi focused on commerce. In the 18th century, the company sold iron bars, horseshoes, iron wheel rims, sickles, files, stoves, and iron wire, as well as scrap metal. In the 19th century, industrialization, the construction of railway lines and steam engines, as well as the Franco-Prussian War of 1870-1871, led to a significant increase in turnover and workforce.

The construction boom after World War II led to strong growth until the 1973 oil crisis. After this turning point, the strategy of the 1980s was again focused on growth: markets were expanded through corporate acquisitions, the sales program and service offerings were expanded.

=== Modern restructuring ===
The real estate crisis of the 1990s was followed by a consolidation phase, combined with restructuring. This restructuring allowed the eighth generation of owners to reduce dependence on ordinary steel, which was subject to strong competition. The company focused on quality and innovation and reduced its product range, which until then had differed little from those of other iron and steel merchants. The company sold most of the stakes acquired in the 1980s as well as areas with weak market shares. Sectors were redefined according to customers rather than products.

In 1997, Pestalozzi acquired Gabs AG in Tägerwilen, a leader in the sheet metal accessories niche. The same year, transport activities were transferred to Transstahl AG.

== Corporate structure and operations ==
The company name has changed over the years: Joh. David Wiser (1789), Gebr. Pestalozzi (1891), Pestalozzi & Co. (1911, entry of the Burckhardt family), Pestalozzi + Co AG (1979, joint-stock company instead of general partnership), and Pestalozzi AG (2019). Since 2019, the holding company has been called Pestalozzi Holding AG.

A stock market listing was considered in the 1990s but ultimately rejected. Since the departure of the Burkchardts in 2000, the Pestalozzi family has once again become the sole owner of the company. In accordance with the tradition of limiting ownership to family members active operationally, it was agreed in 2014, during the transition to the ninth generation, that Matthias Pestalozzi would successively compensate his brothers and sisters.

As of 2022, the company serves approximately 8,500 clients throughout Switzerland, employs 400 staff members, achieves annual sales of CHF 235 million, and operates a fleet of 76 vehicles. The company distributes over 120,000 articles in the form of finished and semi-finished products for construction (plumbing, heating, sheet metal work, metal structures, roofing, and facade construction) and metallurgy.

In 2021, the company was active in the areas of technical equipment and building envelope (Gabs AG), steel processing, as well as transport and logistics (Transstahl AG). The company awards the Pestalozzi Prize for the best apprentice diploma in the industry (Pestalozzi Stiftepriis).

== Bibliography ==
- Pestalozzi, Friedrich Otto; Burckhardt, Fritz; Pestalozzi, Rudolf: 150 Jahre Eisenhandel im Bild der Geschichte eines zürcherischen Familiengeschäftes. Festschrift Pestalozzi & Co., 1788-1938, 1938.
- Pestalozzi-Keyser, Hans: Geschichte der Familie Pestalozzi, 1958.
- Pestalozzi & Co. AG: 175 Jahre Eisen. Festschrift, 1963.
- Pestalozzi & Co. AG: Pestalozzi + Co. AG. Jubiläums-Schrift zum 200jährigen Bestehen unseres Familienunternehmens, 1788-1988, 1988.
- Barraud Wiener, Christine; Abegg, Regine: Die Stadt Zürich. Altstadt links der Limmat – Profanbauten, 2003, pp. 52-53 (Die Kunstdenkmäler des Kantons Zürich, nouvelle édition, 2/2).
- Dünki, Robert: "Die Geschäftsübergabe von Heinrich Wiser (1709-1792) an seinen Sohn David Wiser (1759-1840) im Jahr 1788. Aus der Frühzeit der Eisenhandlung Pestalozzi & Co. AG", in: Jahresbericht Stadtarchiv Zürich, 2007-2008, 2009, pp. 109-160.
- Pestalozzi & Co. AG: 250 Jahre Pestalozzi. 9 Generationen Familientradition, 1763-2013, 2013.
