= Swiss Catholic Women's League =

Swiss Catholic women's organization founded in 1912

Swiss Catholic Women's Federation
- Schweizerischer Katholischer Frauenbund Ligue suisse de femmes catholiques, LSFC Unione svizzera delle donne cattoliche
- Abbreviation: SKF
- Formation: 1912
- Type: Umbrella organization
- Purpose: Religious, social, and charitable activities
- Headquarters: Luzern, Switzerland
- Members: c. 120,000 (2021)
- Official language: German, French, Italian

The Swiss Catholic Women's League (SKF) (Note: German: Schweizerischer Katholischer Frauenbund, SKF; French: Ligue suisse de femmes catholiques, LSFC; Italian: Unione svizzera delle donne cattoliche) is a Swiss umbrella organization of Catholic women's associations founded in 1912. Originally established to promote religious life and social-charitable activities among Catholic women, the organization has evolved to take progressive positions on various social and political issues, sometimes diverging from official Catholic Church doctrine. Today, it also admits non-Catholics and men.

In 2021, the SKF was organized into 600 local associations and 18 cantonal federations. It counted around 120,000 members (compared to 200,000 in 2010).

== History ==
=== Foundation and early years ===
Towards the end of the 19th century, numerous mothers', daughters', and support associations, as well as Elisabeth, workers', and teachers' associations emerged in Catholic regions and mixed-denominational cantons of Switzerland. An attempt to integrate these Catholic organizations into the previously male-only Swiss Catholic Popular Association (SKVV) was considered unsuccessful by 1907. A first federation established in 1906 found no support.

In 1912, representatives of Catholic women's organizations made a second attempt and founded the Swiss Catholic Women's Federation as an umbrella organization on the initiative of the SKVV. The leadership of the federation, which counted around 26,000 members at its founding, was entrusted to female relatives and family members of Catholic politicians, association leaders, and church dignitaries.

The goal of the SKF was to promote religious life in families, communities, and the state, as well as social-charitable activities by women. In its early years, the SKF focused primarily on moral and ethical themes and war relief during World War I. In 1918, it opened a social-charitable women's school in Luzern (later the Social Women's School, taken over by the Association School for Social Work Luzern in 1961, and transformed into the Higher Technical School for Social Work Luzern in 1990).

=== Political engagement and women's suffrage ===
At the Saffa (Swiss Exhibition for Women's Work) 1928, the SKF worked actively with bourgeois women's organizations for the first time. However, after the Catholic women took a position against women's suffrage in 1929, further rapprochement was discontinued. During World War II, the SKF's dependence on the official church increased through its integration into Catholic Action.

In 1945, the SKF voted for the first time against episcopal instruction for abstention on women's suffrage at a conference. Some members from the supporters' camp subsequently founded the Civic Association of Catholic Swiss Women. By 1957, the SKF was already active in the Working Group of Women's Associations for Women's Political Rights. In 1958, it established the relief organization Saint-Elisabeth for women in the Third World.

=== Modern developments ===
In the 1960s and 1970s, the LSFC continued to defend conservative political positions on issues such as women's equality and abortion. In 1976, challenging the "time limit" solution to abortion, it created a solidarity fund for expectant mothers in need. Increased attention was now paid to pastoral lay work. In the 1980s and 1990s, the SKF placed new emphasis on continuing education, which took place from 1996 in the association's own education center in Schwarzenberg (sold in 2009).

At the beginning of the 21st century, the SKF often took progressive positions in social and political discourse that did not align with the official church. Among other things, it advocated for same-sex marriage, women's priesthood, and climate justice. In 2019, cooperation was agreed upon with Protestant Women Switzerland.

== Leadership ==
The first central president of the SKF was Emilie Gutzwiller-Meyer, who came from the Basel upper bourgeoisie. Under Lina Beck-Meyenberger – an advocate of women's suffrage who presided over the SKF from 1941 to 1957 – the association achieved recognition at the federal level. Elisabeth Blunschy continued this engagement and became the first female President of the National Council in 1977. The association's business office was led by a multi-member leadership from 2004, and by a two-member leadership from 2019.

== Publications ==
The SKF has published several association magazines throughout its history. The oldest, the St. Elisabeths-Rosen, dates back to 1908. The last successor publication of this socio-politically oriented magazine merged with the organ of the Protestant Women's Federation and appeared from 1971 to 2013 under the title "Steps into the Open" (Schritte ins Offene).

A member association of the SKF founded the magazine "The Catholic Family" (Die katholische Familie) in 1933. After several name changes, this publication, which was called "Frauenbunt" from 1999, was discontinued in 2005. Its successor, the association magazine "Qu(elle)", appeared quarterly from 2006 to 2018; since then it has been published three times a year.

== See also ==
- Adèle Pestalozzi

== Bibliography ==
- Mesmer, Beatrix: Ausgeklammert – Eingeklammert. Frauen- und Frauenorganisationen in der Schweiz des 19. Jahrhunderts, 1988, pp. 268–277.
- Altermatt, Urs: Katholizismus und Moderne. Zur Sozial- und Mentalitätsgeschichte der Schweizer Katholiken im 19. und 20. Jahrhundert, 1989, pp. 209–216.
- Vorburger, Esther: Der Schweizerische Katholische Frauenbund (SKF) und die Geistlichkeit. Der Verbandsalltag zwischen Abhängigkeit und Selbständigkeit. Vom politischen Tiefschlaf 1929 zum emanzipatorischen Erwachen 1946, Lizenziatsarbeit, Universität Zürich, 2001.
