= Swiss Society of Engineers and Architects =

Swiss professional association

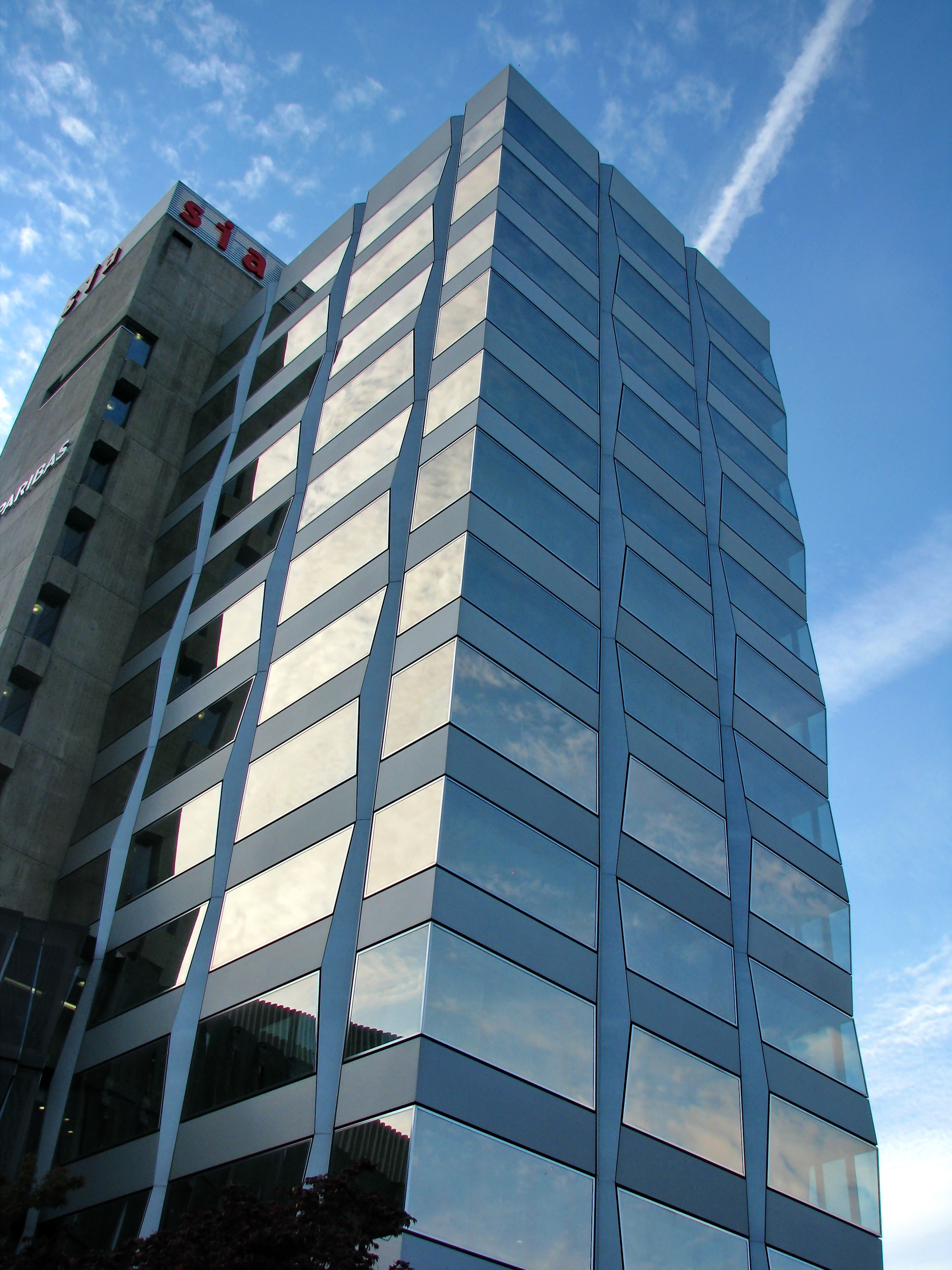
- Abbreviation: SIA
- Founded: 1837
- Headquarters: Zurich
- Members: ~15,000 (2010)
- Website: sia.ch

The Swiss Society of Engineers and Architects (SIA) (Note: German: Schweizerischer Ingenieur- und Architekten-Verein, SIA; French: Société suisse des ingénieurs et des architectes, SIA; Italian: Società svizzera degli ingegneri e degli architetti, SIA) is a Swiss professional association for specialists in construction, engineering, industry, and the environment. Founded in 1837 in Aarau, it has grown to become a national organization with approximately 15,000 members as of 2010.

== History ==
The society was founded in Aarau in 1837 under the name Swiss Society of Engineers and Architects by architects, engineers, construction and road inspectors, as well as contractors. Its original purpose was to promote continuing education among its members. Working in close collaboration with the Federal Polytechnic School in Zurich (now ETH Zurich), it rapidly evolved into a professional association and national interest group for all specialists in construction, engineering, industry, and the environment.

The SIA established a permanent secretariat in 1910 and has been headquartered in the SIA House in Zurich since 1970. The society developed its first fee regulations in 1877 and adopted a code of honor in 1909, which required all persons involved in planning and construction processes to adhere to professional ethics. Between 1910 and 1937, the SIA published the thirty volumes of The Bourgeois House in Switzerland.

In 2024 the SIA elected Susanne Zenker, a Swedish born architect, as their president. Zenker is the first woman to hold this position.

== Organization ==
The SIA comprises a central society with its permanent secretariat, regional sections, professionals divided into four groups since 2000, and numerous affiliated professional associations. The organization develops standards (beginning in 1883 for artificial stones), contracts (from 1910 onwards for tenders and construction), as well as basic documents and information on specific topics.

== Publications ==
The society publishes official organs in three languages. In German, the weekly magazine Tec 21 (previously Eisenbahn from 1874 to 1882, Schweizerische Bauzeitung/Revue polytechnique suisse from 1883 to 1978, and SIA: Schweizer Ingenieur und Architekt from 1979 to 2000). In French, Tracés (formerly Bulletin technique de la Suisse romande from 1875 to 2001), and in Italian, the monthly Rivista tecnica (Rivista tecnica della Svizzera italiana from 1910 to 1964).
