= Otto Stoll =

Swiss linguist and ethnologist (1849–1922)

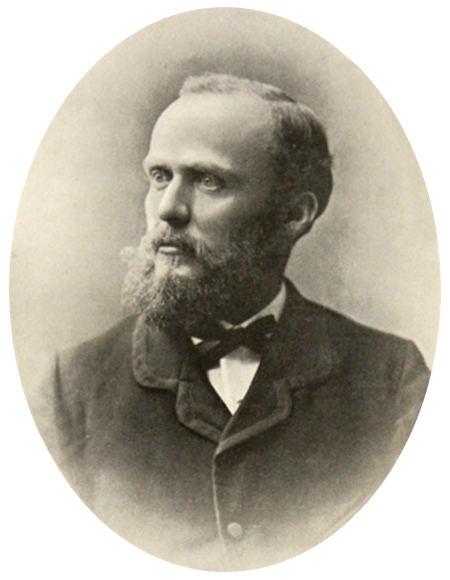
Otto Stoll (1849–1922)

Otto Stoll (29 December 1849 in Frauenfeld – 18 August 1922 in Zürich) was a Swiss linguist and ethnologist.

Otto Stoll was a professor of ethnology and geography at the University of Zurich who specialized in research of Mayan languages. From 1878 to 1883 he conducted scientific studies in Guatemala. He was the author of several treatises on Guatemala, including important works in the fields on ethnography and ethno-linguistics. Stoll also published on neotropical Acari with a major work being the volume in the Biologia Centrali-Americana between Dec. 1886 and Jan. 1893.

== Publications ==
- Zur Ethnographie der Republik Guatemala (Ethnography of the Republic of Guatemala), 1884.
- Guatemala: Reisen und Schilderungen aus den Jahren 1878–1883 (Guatemala: travel and descriptions from the years 1878–1883), 1886.
- Biologia Centrali-Americana/ Arachnida – Acaridea, (Central American biology, Arachnida - Acaridae), 1886–1893.
- Die Sprache der Ixil-Indianer: ein Beitrag zur Ethnologie und Linguistik der Maya-Völker (The language of the Ixil people: a contribution to anthropology and linguistics of the Mayan peoples), 1887.
- Die Sprache der Ixil-Indianer/ Nebst einem Anhang/ Wortverzeichnisse aus dem nordwestlichen Guatemala (The language of the Ixil people; including an addendum and directory of northwestern Guatemala), 1887.
- Suggestion und Hypnotismus in der Völkerpsychologie (Suggestion and hypnotism in ethnic psychology), 1894.
- Zur Zoogeographie der landbewohnenden Wirbellosen (Zoogeography of terrestrial invertebrates), 1897.
- Das Geschlechtsleben in der Völkerpsychologie, (Sex life in ethnic psychology), 1908
- Zur Kenntnis des Zauberglaubens der Volksmagie und Volksmedizin in der Schweiz (Information involving the fascination with folk magic and medicine in Switzerland), 1909.
