= Georg Gustav Roskoff =

Georg Gustav Roskoff (1814–1889) was an Austrian theologian who was professor of Old Testament exegesis at Vienna University from 1850 to 1884.

His main work deals with the historical development of dualism in which he traces the figure of the Devil in human thought from the beginnings until his own time. His History of the Devil (1869) is still considered a standard work on the topic, although it has been criticized for repeating Gottfried Christian Voigt's unrealistic figure of nine million victims of the Early Modern witch-trials.

== Bibliography ==
- Die hebräischen Alterthümer in Briefen, Wien 1857
- Die Simsonfrage nach ihrer Entstehung, Form u. Bedeutung u. der Heraclesmythus, Leipzig 1860
- Geschichte des Teufels. [Added in later editions:] Eine kulturhistorische Satanologie von den Anfängen bis ins 18. Jahrhundert, Leipzig 1869 ISBN 978-3-937229-69-0
- Das Religionswesen der rohesten Naturvölker, Leipzig 1880.
