= Friedrich Pestalozzi =

Swiss agriculturalist and politician (1871–1933)

- Born: February 22, 1871; Zurich, Switzerland
- Died: May 15, 1933 (aged 62); Wil, St. Gallen, Switzerland
- Other name: Peter Finkli
- Occupations: Agriculturalist, politician
- Political party: Radical
- Spouse: Emmy Albertine Ernst (m. 1899)
- Children: Hanni Pestalozzi
- Parent(s): Adolf Salomon Pestalozzi; Bertha Magdalena Schulthess

Friedrich Pestalozzi (22 February 1871 – 15 May 1933) was a Swiss agriculturalist and politician from Zurich. He served as a member of the Cantonal Council of St. Gallen and the National Council, while also playing a significant role in Swiss agricultural organizations and advocacy for farmers' interests.

== Early life and education ==
Friedrich Pestalozzi was born on 22 February 1871 in Zurich to Adolf Salomon Pestalozzi, a banker, and Bertha Magdalena née Schulthess. He was Protestant and held citizenship of Zurich.

Pestalozzi studied agronomy at the Federal Polytechnic School of Zurich and at the polytechnic schools of Halle and Berlin. He completed internships with landowners in East Prussia and Hanover, gaining practical experience in agricultural management.

== Career ==
=== Agricultural work ===
From 1895, Pestalozzi worked as a farmer at Hofberg in Wil, St. Gallen. His agricultural work became the foundation for his later involvement in farming organizations and political advocacy for rural interests.

=== Political career ===
Pestalozzi entered politics as a member of the Radical Party. He served as a deputy in the Cantonal Council of St. Gallen from 1921 to 1933 and was elected to the Swiss National Council from 1929 to 1933. In the Federal Assembly, he was a member of the agricultural club and defended the interests of the peasant class.

=== Agricultural organizations ===
Pestalozzi held several important positions in Swiss agricultural organizations. He was a member of the expanded committee of the Swiss Farmers' Union from 1925 to 1933, secretary of the St. Gallen Farmers' Union from 1930 to 1933, and secretary of the Cantonal Agricultural Society from 1931 to 1933. He supported the creation of agricultural organizations and was instrumental in establishing the agricultural school of Flawil in 1932.

Under the pseudonym Peter Finkli, Pestalozzi contributed to the St. Galler Bauer publication.

== Personal life ==
In 1899, Pestalozzi married Emmy Albertine Ernst, daughter of Karl Ernst. Their daughter, Hanni Pestalozzi, also worked at Hofberg and was particularly active in agricultural women's associations.

Pestalozzi died on 15 May 1933 in Wil, St. Gallen.

== Bibliography ==
- St. Galler Bauer, 20 May 1933, pp. 563–565.
