= Diethelm Georg Finsler =

Swiss Protestant pastor and theologian (1819–1899)

- Born: December 24, 1819; Zurich, Switzerland
- Died: April 1, 1899 (aged 79); Zurich, Switzerland
- Education: University of Zurich; University of Bonn
- Occupations: Pastor, theologian, politician
- Spouse: Elisabetha Magdalena Zeller
- Parent(s): Johann Georg Finsler (father); Anna Gessner (mother)
- Relatives: Georg Gessner (grandfather)

Diethelm Georg Finsler (24 December 1819 – 1 April 1899) was a Swiss Protestant pastor, theologian, and politician who served as the last antistes of the Zurich church from 1866 to 1896. He played a significant role in establishing ecclesiastical law on presbyter-synodal and democratic foundations and contributed to the creation of the Conference of Protestant Churches of Switzerland.

== Early life and education ==
Finsler was born on 24 December 1819 in Zurich to Johann Georg Finsler, a pastor and dean, and Anna Gessner. He married Elisabetha Magdalena Zeller of Zurich.

Finsler studied theology and philosophy at the University of Zurich, continuing his studies under Karl Immanuel Nitzsch at the University of Bonn. He was consecrated as a pastor in 1842.

== Ecclesiastical career ==
After his consecration, Finsler served as a suffragant at the Neumünster in Zurich in 1844. He subsequently held pastoral positions in Berg am Irchel beginning in 1850, in Wipkingen from 1867, and at the Grossmünster in Zurich from 1871.

As the last antistes of the Zurich church from 1866 to 1896, Finsler dedicated himself to establishing ecclesiastical law founded on presbyter-synodal and democratic principles. He contributed significantly to the creation of the Conference of Protestant Churches of Switzerland. As a member of the Zurich synodal council, he advocated for Good Friday to become a public holiday.

=== Publishing and theological work ===
From 1860, Finsler served as one of the editors of the Kirchenblatt für die reformierte Schweiz (Church Paper for Reformed Switzerland), where he defended a moderate theological position between conservatives and reformists. He published various scholarly works, including Kirchliche Statistik der reformierten Schweiz (Ecclesiastical Statistics of Reformed Switzerland) in 1854. In recognition of his scholarly contributions, he received an honorary doctorate in theology from the University of Basel in 1860.

=== Organizational leadership ===
Finsler held leadership positions in several religious organizations. He directed the Association of Swiss Churches and the Zwingli-Verein. He was also a member of the Protestant Mutual Aid of the Canton of Zurich.

== Political career ==
Finsler served as a deputy to the Constituent Assembly from 1868 to 1869 and was a member of the Cantonal Council of Zürich from 1873 to 1896.

== Bibliography ==
- Allgemeine Deutsche Biographie, vol. 48, pp. 556-559
- G. Finsler, R. Finsler, Diethelm Georg Finsler, der letzte Antistes der zürcherischen Kirche, 1916-1917
- P. Schweizer, Freisinnig - positiv - religiössozial, 1972, pp. 278-279
