= Johannes Wild =

Swiss engineer, cartographer and professor (1814-1894)

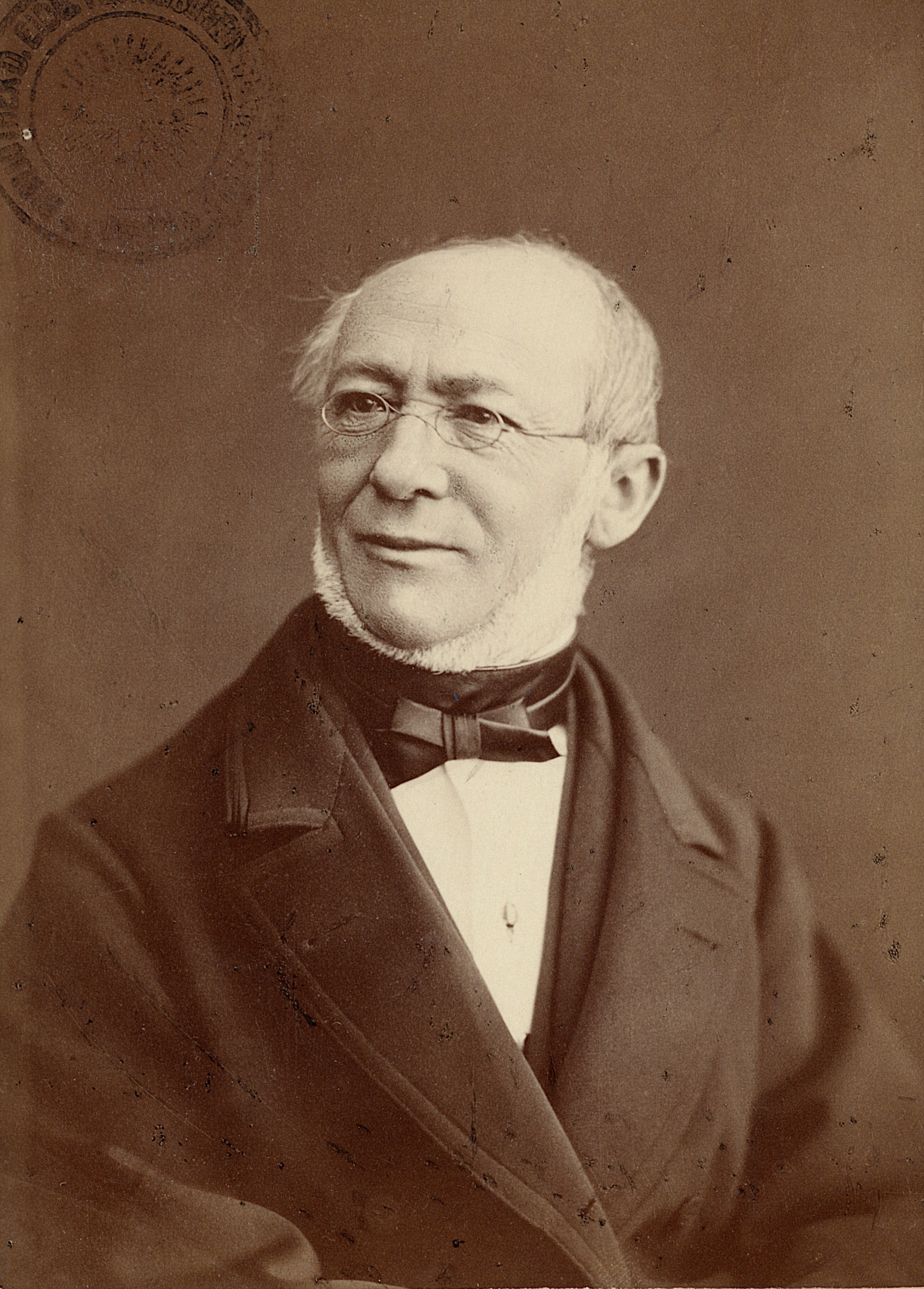
- Portrait of Johannes Wild. Lithograph no. 119 from 1889 from the Album national suisse, Zurich, Orell Füssli, 1888-1907
- Born: March 13, 1814; Richterswil, Switzerland
- Died: August 22, 1894 (aged 80); Richterswil, Switzerland
- Education: Industrial school (1831), University of Zurich (1833-1836), Munich (1836), Vienna (civil engineering and astronomy)
- Occupations: Engineer, cartographer, professor
- Known for: Dufour Map measurements, Wild map of Canton of Zurich, telegraph administration
- Parent(s): Hans Jakob Wild (father), Elisabetha Wunderli (mother)

Johannes Wild (13 March 1814 – 22 August 1894) was a Swiss civil engineer, cartographer, and professor who made significant contributions to Swiss cartography and geodesy in the 19th century. He is best known for creating the detailed topographical map of the Canton of Zurich, known as the "Wild map", which was groundbreaking for its use of contour lines to represent terrain relief.

== Early life and education ==
Johannes Wild was born on 13 March 1814 in Richterswil, a municipality on the shores of Lake Zurich. He was the son of Hans Jakob Wild, a farmer, and Elisabetha Wunderli. Wild was Protestant, and remained unmarried throughout his life.

Wild received his early education at an industrial school in 1831. He then pursued higher education at the University of Zurich from 1833 to 1836, followed by studies in Munich in 1836. He completed his education in Vienna, where he studied civil engineering and astronomy.

== Career ==
=== Surveying and cartography ===
From 1838 to 1842, Wild conducted measurements for the Dufour Map, the first official topographical map of Switzerland. He had previously participated in the basic triangulation work under the direction of Johannes Eschmann. During this period, he also worked on railway projects and conducted a survey of hydraulic energy resources in the Canton of Zurich. In 1842-1843, Wild performed glaciological surveys for the naturalist Louis Agassiz.

Wild's most significant cartographic achievement was the creation of a detailed map of the Canton of Zurich. The project was undertaken from 1843 to 1851 under his direction and published between 1852 and 1865 in thirty-two sheets. This map, known as the "Wild map", was innovative for its time due to its representation of terrain relief using contour lines, a technique that was not yet widely adopted in Swiss cartography. The map set new standards for topographical accuracy and visual representation of landscape features.

=== Telegraph and railway administration ===
In 1852, Wild was appointed as director of the Federal Telegraph Administration in Bern, where he oversaw the development of Switzerland's early telecommunications infrastructure. From 1853 to 1854, he served as a director of the Zurich-Lake Constance and Northeast railway companies.

=== Academia ===
In 1855, Wild was appointed as a full professor of geodesy and topography at the newly established ETH Zurich (Swiss Federal Institute of Technology). He held this position for 34 years until his retirement in 1889, making him one of the institution's longest-serving faculty members. His teaching and research contributed significantly to the development of surveying and mapping techniques in Switzerland. In recognition of his scientific contributions, Wild was awarded an honorary doctorate (honoris causa) by the University of Zurich in 1883.

== Death ==
Johannes Wild died on 22 August 1894 in his hometown of Richterswil, where he had been born 80 years earlier.
