= Hans Conrad Lochmann =

Swiss politician (1737–1815)

- Born: 6 March 1737
- Died: 8 March 1815 (aged 78)
- Occupation: Politician
- Spouse: Esther Escher vom Glas (m. 1759)
- Parents: Hans Conrad Lochmann (father); Regula von Muralt (mother)
- Relatives: Ulrich Lochmann (uncle)

Hans Conrad Lochmann (6 March 1737 – 8 March 1815) was a Swiss politician from Zurich. He was a member of the Grand Council of Zurich from 1770 to 1798, sat on the Small Council as a guild master from 1778 to 1798, and was Statthalter of Zurich from 1794 to 1798.

== Biography ==
Hans Conrad Lochmann was born on 6 March 1737, the son of Hans Conrad Lochmann and Regula von Muralt. He was a nephew of Ulrich Lochmann. In 1759 he married Esther Escher vom Glas.

Lochmann began military training in Metz but broke it off and studied architecture in Paris. After the death of his brother Heinrich in 1756 he returned to Zurich, and in 1757 he became a member of the Kämbel guild.

From 1770 to 1798 Lochmann was a member of the Grand Council of Zurich, and from 1778 to 1798 he sat on the Small Council as guild master (Zunftmeister). From 1794 to 1798 he was Statthalter (deputy mayor) of Zurich, and in 1794 he presided over the citizens' library (Burgerbibliothek). In 1802–1803 he was a member of the Grand Council of the city of Zurich.

From 1788 to 1814 Lochmann administered the lottery fund of the Physical Society (Physikalische Gesellschaft). He died on 8 March 1815.

== Bibliography ==
- C. Keller-Escher, Promptuarium genealogicum, n.d. (Zentralbibliothek Zürich)
- F. Rudio, Festschrift der Naturforschenden Gesellschaft in Zürich 1746–1896, 1896, 122 f.
