= Nicholas Belfield Dennys =

British civil servant, journalist and sinologist

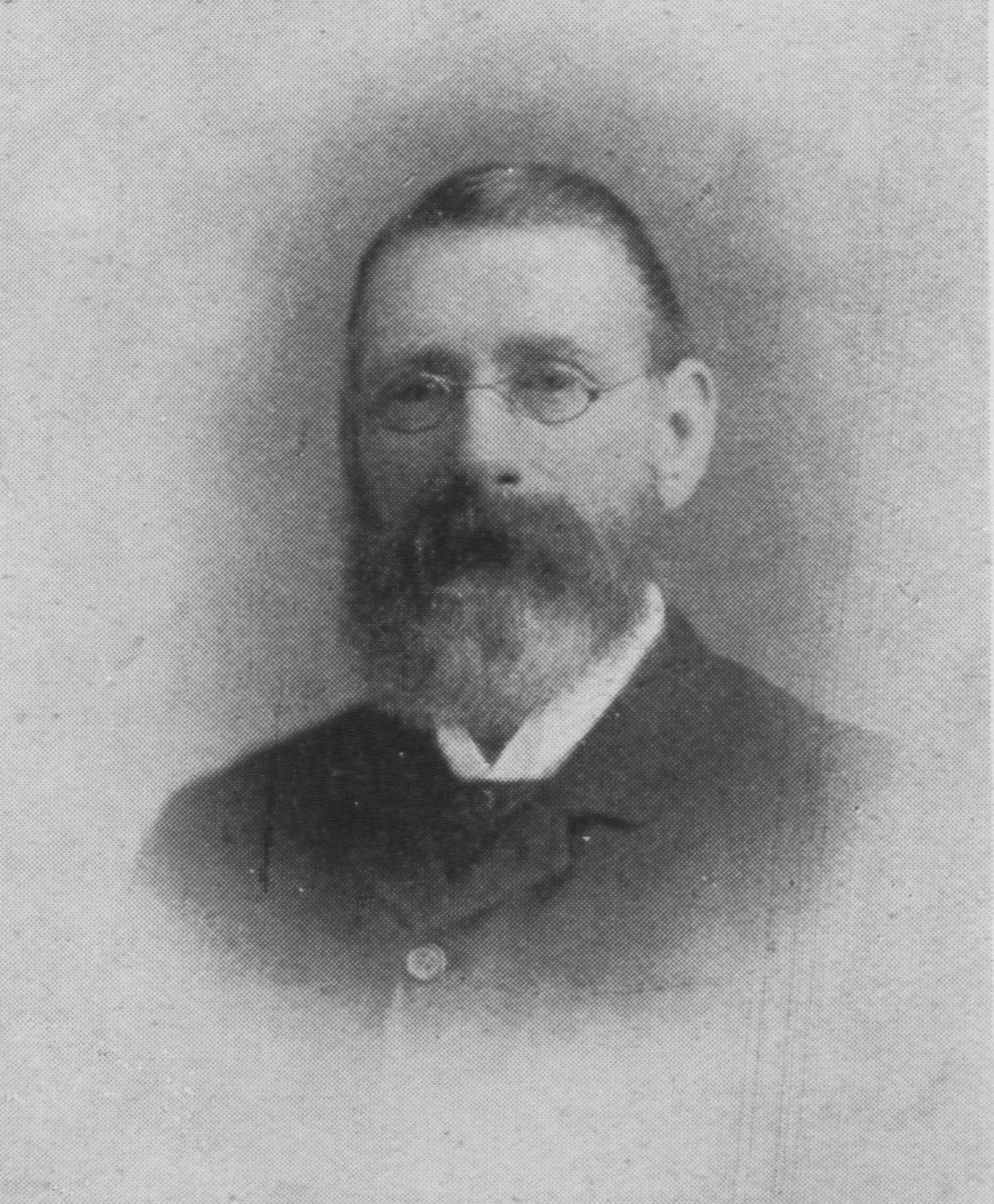
- Born: 25 January 1839
- Died: 5 December 1900 (aged 61)
- Occupation: Civil servant
- Military career
- Allegiance: United Kingdom
- Branch: Navy
- Conflicts: Battle of Suomenlinna
- Awards: Baltic Medal

Nicholas Belfield Dennys (25 January 1839 – 5 December 1900) was a British civil servant and journalist in China. He studied Chinese folklore and wrote several studies on the language and culture.

== Biography ==
Dennys joined the civil department of the British Navy in 1855. After seeing action at the Battle of Suomenlinna in 1855 he received a Baltic Medal and resigned from the Navy to join the Consular Service in China in 1863. Here he learned Chinese and resigned to own and take up editorship of the newspaper China Mail. He edited the newspaper until 1876 while also serving as curator of the Hong Kong museum and library.

In 1877 he became assistant-protector of Chinese at Singapore and Justice of Peace for the Straits Settlements. While in Singapore he served as honorary curator for the Raffles Museum. He was posted magistrate in the Federated Malay States in 1889 but poor health forced him to resign. In 1900 he was operated for a tumour but died following the procedure. Dennys wrote several books including The Treaty Ports of China and the Folklore of China and is considered a pioneer of Sinological studies. He also invented an anti-fouling paint (Zocus) and a system of electrical lighting known as the Dennys-Cuff system.
