= Swiss Association for Women's Suffrage =

Swiss women's organization

- Association suisse pour le suffrage féminin (ASSF) Schweizerischer Verband für Frauenstimmrecht (SVF) Associazione svizzera per il suffragio femminile (ASSF)
- Successor: Swiss Association for Women's Rights
- Formation: 1909
- Dissolved: 1971
- Purpose: Promotion of women's suffrage in Switzerland

The Swiss Association for Women's Suffrage (SVF, ASSF) (Note: German: Schweizerischer Verband für Frauenstimmrecht, SVF; French: Association suisse pour le suffrage féminin, ASSF; Italian: Associazione svizzera per il suffragio femminile, ASSF) was a women's organization in Switzerland, founded in 1909. It was one of the two main women's suffrage organisations in Switzerland, alongside the Bund Schweizerischer Frauenvereine (BSF). It was one of the main supporters of the yes campaign ahead of the referendum of 1971, in which women were granted the right to vote.

The organization became the Swiss Association for Women's Rights (Note: German: Schweizerischer Verband für Frauenrechte, SVF; French: Association suisse pour les droits de la femme, ADF; Italian: Associazione svizzera per i diritti della donna) in 1971 following the achievement of federal women's suffrage.

== History ==
=== Foundation and early years ===
In the feminist ferment of the early 20th century, the demand for full political equality between men and women divided many Swiss women's societies. While a majority of activists preferred to demand partial political rights for tactical reasons, particularly on the advice of Carl Hilty, a specialist in public law, some were inspired by the transnational suffrage movement. Associations dedicated to the fight for women's suffrage were founded from 1905 onwards in major Swiss cities, and these constituted themselves as the Swiss Association for Women's Suffrage (SVF) at the federal level in 1909. Key founders included Pauline Chaponnière-Chaix, Camille Vidart, and Auguste de Morsier.

Through its member associations, the SVF brought together an overwhelming majority of activists, often unmarried, university-educated and salaried (notably teachers, and increasingly, lawyers), mainly from the liberal, Protestant, and especially urban bourgeoisie, along with some male activists, often engaged in politics. SVF members were relatively few in number (765 people in 1909) but had important networks, thanks to their links with the political elite and their multiple commitments in other women's societies. The SVF's close proximity to the male ruling class provided a significant source of information and access to political decision-makers, though it also limited means of action by constraining the association to a certain loyalty towards its male allies.

From its creation, the SVF adopted both egalitarian and dualist arguments to justify women's suffrage. Although it claimed the possibility of a new interpretation of Article 4 of the Constitution in favor of admitting Swiss women into the electorate, notably under the influence of Antoinette Quinche, the SVF resigned itself to a strategy of progressive conquest of political rights favored by its allies in the political world and other women's societies.

=== Campaigns and setbacks ===
At the end of World War I, with the idea that services rendered by women should be rewarded, the SVF supported socialist interventions in favor of women's suffrage and engaged in the votes that took place in several cantons, notably in Geneva where a first popular initiative was submitted to the people in 1920. After their failure, the SVF turned to other questions, notably that of recognizing women's work.

The success of the first SAFFA (Swiss Exhibition for Women's Work) in 1928 revived the SVF's activism in favor of women's suffrage: it launched a federal petition to this effect in 1929 with socialist women. Despite its success (249,237 signatures, including 78,840 from men and 170,397 from women), the petition received no response from the Federal Council. The association was also involved internationally, especially through the key role that Emilie Gourd played as secretary of the International Woman Suffrage Alliance.

In the 1930s, the SVF took part in new attempts to unify the feminist movement, for example with the creation of the working community "Woman and Democracy" in 1934. World War II again raised hopes for circumstances favorable to women's voting rights. The SVF was in the front line during the creation of a Swiss Action Committee for Women's Suffrage in 1945, as well as during the various cantonal votes on this question between 1940 and 1951, all of which ended in failure.

In 1957, the SVF, like the Alliance of Swiss Women's Societies (of which the SVF has become a member in 1949), opposed the Federal Council's project to integrate women into civil defense, and demanded women's suffrage before any new obligation. The SVF subsequently engaged in the campaign for the 1959 suffrage vote, which failed at the federal level but opened the front for its achievement at the cantonal level. Subsequently, the SVF intensified its political training activities for women.

At the end of the 1960s, the association denounced the Federal Council's project to ratify the European Convention on Human Rights in the absence of universal suffrage. At the same time, young feminists from the Women's Liberation Movement strongly contested the consensual positioning of historical feminist associations, notably the SVF. These criticisms provided an impetus for activists and led, among other things, to the March on Bern in 1969.

After obtaining women's suffrage at the federal level in 1971, the SVF continued to fight for it in the last cantons that still refused it. It changed its name to Swiss Association for Women's Rights and increasingly oriented itself towards supporting women's political engagement and equality of rights in economic and social fields.

== Chairperson ==
- 1909-1912: Auguste de Morsier
- 1912-1914: Louise von Arx-Lack
- 1914-1928: Emilie Gourd
- 1928-1940 Annie Leuch-Reineck
- 1940-1952 Elisabeth Vischer-Alioth
- 1952-1959 Alix Choisy-Necker
- 1959-1960: Gertrud Heinzelmann
- 1960-1968 Lotti Ruckstuhl
- 1968-1977 Gertrude Girard-Montet

== Bibliography ==
- Woodtli, Susanna: Gleichberechtigung. Der Kampf um die politischen Rechte der Frau in der Schweiz, 1983²
- Escher, Nora: Entwicklungstendenzen der Frauenbewegung in der deutschen Schweiz, 1850-1918/19, 1985
- Joris, Elisabeth; Witzig, Heidi (ed.): Frauengeschichte(n). Dokumente aus zwei Jahrhunderten zur Situation der Frauen in der Schweiz, 1986
- Mesmer, Beatrix: Ausgeklammert-eingeklammert. Frauen und Frauenorganisationen in der Schweiz des 19. Jahrhunderts, 1988
- Ruckstuhl, Lotti: Vers la majorité politique. Histoire du suffrage féminin en Suisse, 1990 (German 1986)
- Hardmeier, Sibylle: Frühe Frauenstimmrechtsbewegung in der Schweiz (1890-1930). Argumente, Strategien, Netzwerk und Gegenbewegung, 1997
- Voegeli, Yvonne: Zwischen Hausrat und Rathaus. Auseinandersetzungen um die politische Gleichberechtigung der Frauen in der Schweiz 1945-1971, 1997
- Weilenmann, Claudia (ed.): Femmes, pouvoir, histoire. Evénements de l'histoire des femmes et de l'égalité des sexes en Suisse de 1848 à 1998, 2 vol., 1998-1999
- Gosteli, Marthe (ed.): Histoire oubliée. Chronique illustrée du mouvement féministe 1914-1963, 2 vol., 2000
- Mesmer, Beatrix: Staatsbürgerinnen ohne Stimmrecht. Die Politik der schweizerischen Frauenverbände 1914-1971, 2007
- Association suisse pour les droits de la femme (ed.): Le combat pour les droits égaux, 2009
