= Alliance F =

Swiss umbrella organization for women's groups

alliance F (Bund Schweizerischer Frauenvereine BSF)
- Founded: 1899
- Location: Kilchberg, Zürich
- Origins: Women's suffrage in Switzerland
- Region served: Switzerland
- Website: alliance F (in German and French)

alliance F (formerly known as German: Bund Schweizerischer Frauenvereine, BSF; French: Alliance de sociétés féminines suisses, ASF) is the Federation of Swiss Women's Associations.

== History ==
The presidents of the progressive women's associations from Bern (Helene von Mülinen), Zürich (Emma Boos-Jegher), Lausanne (Marguerite Duvillard-Chavannes) and Genève (Camille Vidart) dealt at the end of the 19th century AD with training and legal issues. In 1896 they organized the first Swiss women's congress and tried to join all women's organizations in a Swiss umbrella organization. Three years later they called Swiss women's associations to form the Bund Schweizerischer Frauenvereine, and so the founding of the Federation of Swiss Women's Associations (from 1971 BSF) was established. BSF targeted the "mutual stimulation, the common influence on political decision-making bodies, as well as the adequate representation of Swiss women in the international women's movement." In addition to the founding clubs, the trade associations of teachers, and by 1945 also joined around 250 women's associations of different orientation. Since 1903, the BSF is the national umbrella organization representing Switzerland in the International Council of Women (ICW).

On the occasion of the creation of the Swiss Civil Code (ZGB), the BSF tried, largely unsuccessfully, to establish the system of separation of the personal, marital and household property, and to improve the status of illegitimate children. The design of new laws has been a focus of the BSF's activity: morality clauses manifested in the "morality movement", in the new Penal Code, maternity protection and consideration of women in health insurance and the Swiss insurance for old people and surviving dependants (AHV). The publicity for women's suffrage was done by the newly founded Swiss Association for Women's Suffrage, but strongly supported by the BSF after 1909. More focussed activities were on female employment, training, and home economics. The working conditions in the industry and services sectors were examined with inquiries. Through collaboration on the housework and factory legislation, the BSF tried to counter the exploitation of female workers; the relationship between housewife and maids has been regulated with treaties.

The BSF is committed to the compulsory home economics education in Swiss schools and to the general recognition of domestic work as a profession. In 1923 the Schweizerische Central Office for women's careers opened on the initiative of the second Swiss women's congress, which mainly took political influence in addition to giving advice. Female employment was still at risk despite the success of the SAFFA (1928) in the crisis years between the great European wars. With the collaboration of national defence (Frauenhilfsdienst, literally military women's service) and commissions for care and nutrition during the Second World War, BSF became the main interlocutor of the federal authorities. BSF represents Switzerland in international women's organizations, and participated in the League of Nations and after 1945 at UNESCO.

The amendments of 1949 allowed the inclusion of mixed organisations, such as the women's suffrage clubs and the incorporation of the Swiss Federal women's secretariat (founded in 1943). The campaign "Equal pay for equal work" and the SAFFA (1958) with its plea for the three-phase model "Training and profession, motherhood and family, re-entry into the profession", marked the time of a booming economy, and contributed to more equality between women and men. The BSF's focus was the betterment of women by public appreciation, and improvement in childhood and marriage law.

== SAFFA ==
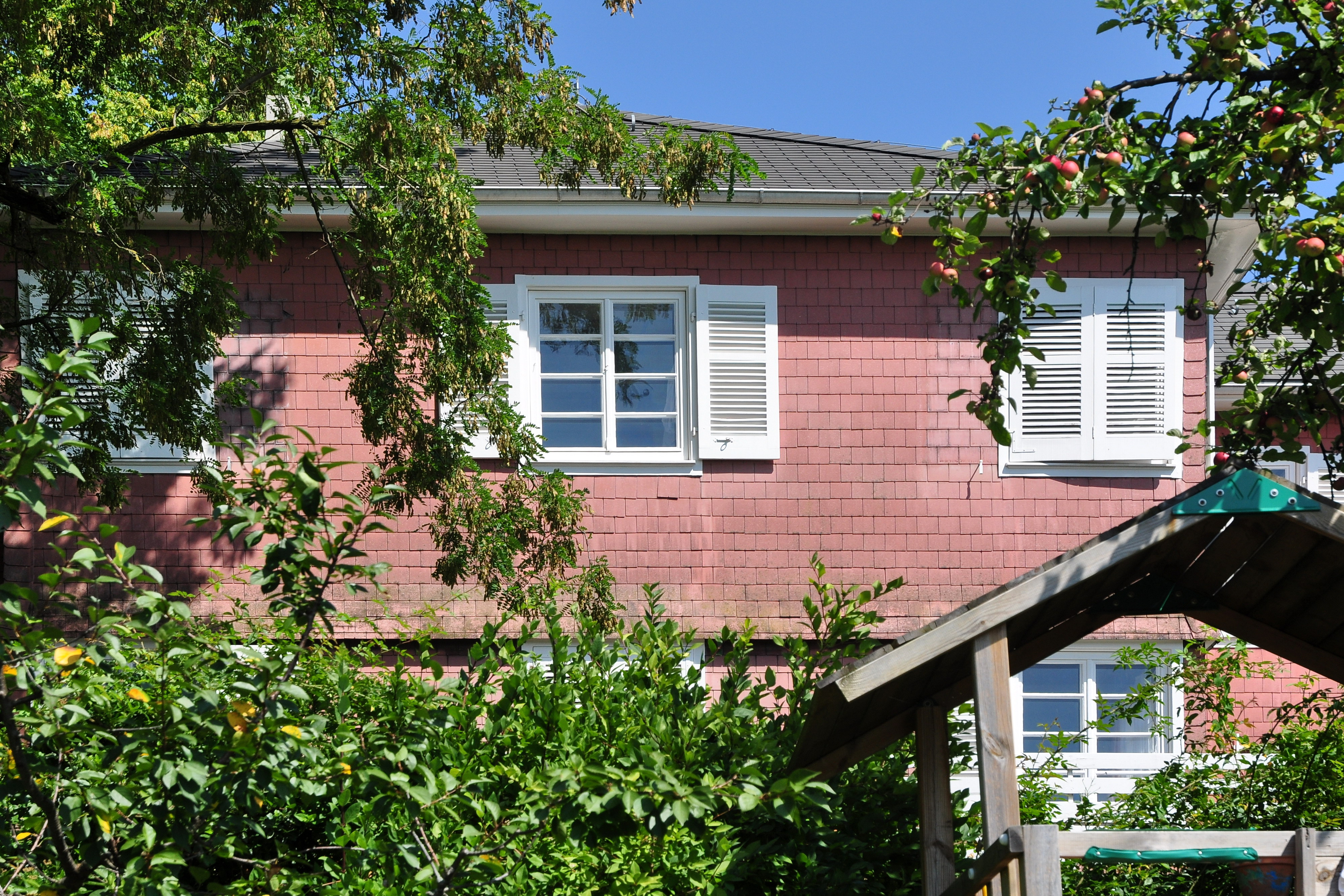
Lux Guyer's SAFFAhaus, as of today in Küsnacht

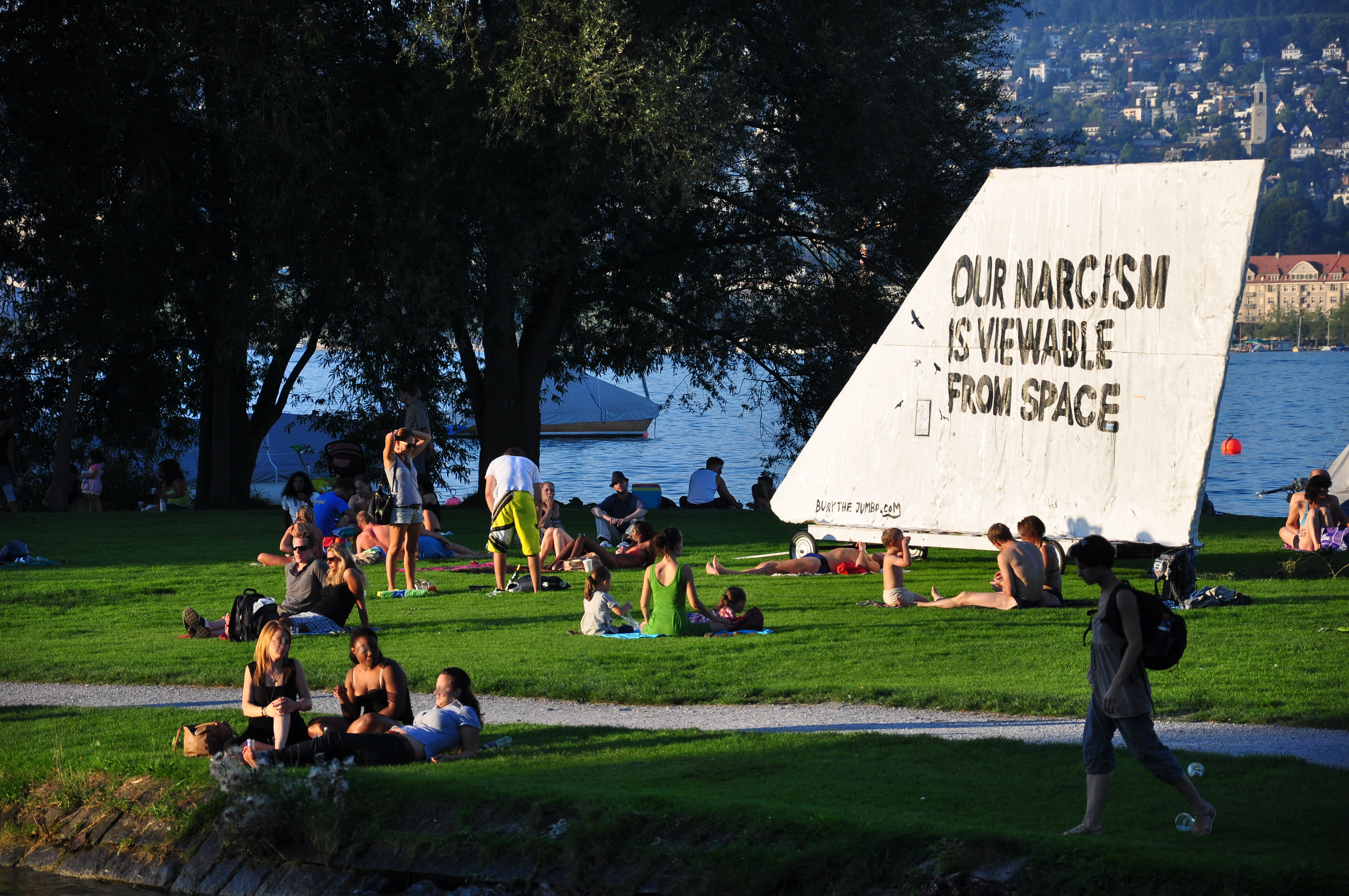
Saffa-Insel on Zürichsee lakeshore in Wollishofen

From 17 July until 15 September 1958, the BSF led the second SAFFA (1.9 million visitors) with over a hundred national and cantonal women's organisations on the Landiwiese in Zürich-Wollishofen. Before, the Saffa-Insel, an artificial island was poured, being still a popular meeting place used also as lido in the summer and for events, among them the Zürcher Theater Spektakel. As chief architect of the exhibition, which stood under the motto "Life circle of women in family, occupation, and country", acted Annemarie Hubacher-Constam. SAFFA presented the women, who were wanted in the booming economy as consumers and workers, possibilities in the areas of education, employment, shopping and leisure. In accordance with the needs of economic and sociopolitical needs, SAFFA promoted the then three-phase model as an 'ideal female curriculum': employment prior to the marriage, motherhood, and return to the labour market. In addition, the women had to absorb negative impacts of the rapidly changing world, nevertheless, by spreading harmony inside and outside of their families. The men should be made aware of 'women services' in the service of the general public on the indispensability and so motivated to fix the social discrimination against women. With the profits from the two exhibitions, solidarity works were established for women. In February 2007, the Swiss Federal Council signed the optional protocol as an addition to the Women Convention for the legal and formal recognition of the full human rights of women in Switzerland. The Internet platform frauennet.ch proposed the decision to organise a third SAFFA on the occasion of their women picnic brunches on the Swiss national holiday on the Saffa-Island in Zürich. For financial reasons, the project could not be started for the time being. Alliance F, the Federation of the Swiss women's organizations, prepared a third Saffa and founded the «2020» association for this purpose, and initiated the project «2020 – der weibliche blick auf die zukunft» (literally: 2020 - the female looks to the future). The project seeks to capture ideas and visions for the future of our society from the perspective of women and in an appropriate manner of the public present. A first web presentation was 2013 and started the realization phase to SAFFA 2020.

== Organisation and profile ==
Since 1970, the BSF had recorded a loss of meaning, which contributed among others the setting of the Swiss woman newspaper (Schweizer Frauenblatt), its press and documentation services, as well as a certain foreclosure over the questioning of traditional gender roles. Also the in 1975 respectively in 1996 initiated fourth and fifth Swiss woman congresses had not stopped this development. The Federal Commission for women's issues took over part of the functions. The relocation of the secretariat to Worblaufen 1986 gave new impetus to the BSF in the archives of the Swiss women's movement (Gosteli Stiftung).

In 1999, the BSF decided to renamed alliance F. The fifth Swiss women's congress "Women 2001" founded the Arbeitsgemeinschaft Frauen 2001 (Argef 2001) for seeking a revision of the so-called three-phase model of 1958. The nationwide spread of the "Ticino Model" in the pre-school and primary school education, may ensure a gainful employment and motherhood.

== Associated organisations and members ==
As of November 2014, alliance F comprises more than 150 nationwide member organizations.

== Representatives (selection) ==
- Emma Pieczynska-Reichenbach (co-founder)
- Camille Vidart (co-founder, member of the board until 1908)
- Emma Boos-Jegher (co-founder, vice president 1912–1916)
- Helene von Mülinen (co-founder, president 1900–1904, member of the board until 1920)
- Pauline Chaponnière-Chaix (co-founder, president 1904–1910 and 1916–1920)
- Klara Honegger (co-founder, president 1911–1916)
- Elisabeth Zellweger (president 1920–1929)
- Anne de Montet-Burckhardt (president 1929–1935)
- Clara Nef (president 1935–1944)
- Adrienne Jeannet-Nicolet (president 1944–1949)
- Gertrud Haemmerli-Schindler (president 1949–1955)
- Denise Berthoud (president 1955–1959)
- Dora Julia Rittmeyer-Iselin (president 1959–1965)
- Rolande Gaillard (president 1965–1971)
- Jacqueline Berenstein-Wavre (president 1975–1980)
- Sibylle Burger-Bono (president 1999–2005)
- Rosmarie Zapfl-Helbling (president 2006–2014)
- Maya Graf (co-president since)
- Elisabeth Nägeli (vice president 1939–1967)
- Jeanne Eder-Schwyzer (member of the board 1949–1957)
- Marthe Gosteli (member of the board 1968–1972)
- Marie Boehlen chairwoman of the Legal Commission

== See also ==
- SAFFA
- Women's suffrage in Switzerland

== Literature ==
- Silke Redolfi: Frauen bauen Staat. 100 Jahre Bund Schweizerischer Frauenorganisationen; 1900–2000. Verlag der NZZ, Zürich 2000, ISBN 3-85823-819-8.
- Sibylle Brändli: Der Supermarkt im Kopf: Konsumkultur und Wohlstand in der Schweiz nach 1945. Böhlau Verlag, Wien 2000, ISBN 9783205992646.
- Marie-Louise Barben, Elisabeth Ryter: Verflixt und zugenähnt. Frauenberufsbildung - Frauenerwerbsarbeit 1888 - 1988. Bern 1988, ISBN 9783905278330.
- M. Beyeler: La SAFFA (Schweiz. Ausstellung für Frauenarbeit) de 1958 à Zurich: son architecture et ses architectes. Dissertation, Lausanne 1999.
- Dorothee Huber: Die Tugend der Not. Zu den beiden historischen Ausstellungen für Frauenarbeit (SAFFA 1928 und 1958). In: Ausstellungen - Darstellungen, Beiträge zum Diplomwahlfach "Frauen in der Geschichte des Bauens", Vol. 3, Petra Stojanik (pbl), Lehrstuhl Flora Ruchat-Roncati ETHZ, Zürich 1995.
