= Members of alliance F =

Swiss umbrella organization members

The members of alliance F (formerly known as German: Bund Schweizerischer Frauenvereine, BSF; French: Alliance de sociétés féminines suisses, ASF) comprises as of November 2014 more than 150 nationwide member organizations, listed by name and year of participation.

Name	Year
Schweiz. Hebammenverband	1902
Swiss Women's Association Liaison Centers	1919
Schweiz. Gärtnerinnenverband	1922
Verband christkath. Frauenvereine der Schweiz	1924
Gesellschaft schweiz. bildender Künstlerinnen (GSBK)	1925
Cevi Schweiz (Schweizer Verband der Christl. Vereine Junger Frauen und Männer)	1928
Schweiz. Verband Hauswirtschaftl. Betriebsleiterinnen und Betriebsleiter	1933
Bund Schweizerischer Jüdischer Frauenorganisationen	1935
Schweiz. Gemeinnützige Gesellschaft	1941
Swiss Association of University Women	1949
SAFFA Bürgschaftsgenossenschaft der Schweizer Frauen	1949
Swiss Association for Women's Suffrage	1949
FDP Frauen Schweiz	1950
Schweiz. Berufsverband für Tanz und Gymnastik	1952
Soroptimist International – Schweizer Union	1953
SV-Service, Schweizer Verband Volksdienst	1955
Schweizer WIZO-Föderation	1956
FORUM elle (Schweiz. Bund der Migros-Genossenschafterinnen)	1957
Zonta-Clubs der Schweiz, Union Inter-City 1	1958
Schweiz. Modegewerbeverband	1965
BPW Switzerland (Schweiz. Verband der Berufs- und Geschäftsfrauen)	1967
Vereinigung Schweizer Ärztinnen	1967
Schweiz. Arbeitsgemeinschaft der bäuerlich-hauswirtschaftl. Beraterinnen (ARBE)	1970
SVP Frauen Schweiz	1972
Schweizer Berufsverband der Krankenschwestern und Krankenpfleger	1978
Association suisse des conseillères en planning familial	1980
Berufsverband der Haushaltleiterinnen und Haushaltleiter (BVHL)	1981
Fachverband der Schweizer Farb- und Modestilberaterinnen	1989
Schule und Elternhaus Schweiz	1989
Rencontres Suisses – Treffpunkt Schweiz	1990
Verband alleinerziehender Mütter und Väter	1990
Vereinigung der BAHA'I Frauen	1991
Europ. Frauen-Union, Schweiz. Landessektion	1992
Vereinigung der Schweizer Tierärztefrauen	1992
Schweiz. Vereinigung der Ingenieurinnen	1993
Tibetische Frauen-Organisation in der Schweiz	1993
Verein Tagesschulen für die Schweiz	1993
European Women's Management Development Network (EWMD)	1995
Arbeitsgemeinschaft unabhängiger Frauen AUF	1997
donna mobile (Arbeitsgemeinschaft Osteoporose Schweiz)	1997
Konsumentenforum Kf deutsche Schweiz	1997
Lyceum Club Suisse	1997
VIDUA Organisation für Verwitwete Schweiz	1998
Verband Wirtschaftsfrauen Schweiz	1999

== See also ==
- Bund Schweizerischer Frauenvereine (BSF)
