= Ida Somazzi =

Swiss educator and women's rights activist

Ida Somazzi (17 December 1882 – 31 July 1963), for whom the Ida Somazzi Prize is named, was a Swiss educator and women's rights activist.

== Life ==
Ida Somazzi was born in Bern, the daughter of Catharina Gamma and Domenico Somazzi, a federal official from Porza. She trained as a primary school teacher and worked as a private tutor in Rosario, Santa Fe, Argentina, from 1901 to 1903.

After qualifying as a secondary school teacher in Bern, she studied history and literature part-time at the University of Bern while teaching. In 1919, she earned her doctorate with the dissertation Geschichte der obrigkeitlichen Lehrgotten im Alten Bern (History of Authoritative Teaching in Old Bern), graduating with summa cum laude. From 1925 until her retirement in 1949, she taught history and German at the upper division of the Monbijou School as a seminar teacher.

Somazzi dedicated her life to youth and adult education and gender equality. From 1919, she advocated for equal pay for equal work. In 1921, she was elected to the executive committee and board of the Swiss League of Nations Association. She was a founding member of the Working Group on Women and Democracy, formed in 1934 to combat fascism and Nazism. In 1948, she became president of this group and also chaired the Study Commission on Women's Issues for the UN and UNESCO. From 1950, she served on the Commission for International Issues of the Federation of Swiss Women's Associations. She championed women's suffrage as a human right in a free democracy and was disappointed by the 1 February 1959 vote against women's suffrage in Switzerland, calling it a decision "against justice and fairness."

In her personal life, Somazzi loved traveling to many countries, mountain hiking, and had a particular fondness for the Arctic regions of the United States.

Her estate is managed by the Gosteli Foundation.

== Honors ==
In her memory, the Working Group on Women and Democracy established the Somazzi Foundation in 1964, which annually awards the Ida Somazzi Prize, endowed by Maria Felchlin.

A street in Bern is named after Ida Somazzi.

== Works ==
- Geschichte der obrigkeitlichen Lehrgotten im alten Bern. Dissertation. Central Board of the Swiss Women Teachers' Association, Zürich, 1925.
- Um die Gleichberechtigung der Frau. Vaterländischer Verlag, Murten, 1948.

Selected articles and lectures

- Warum Mädchen lieber Knaben wären. Schweizerisches Frauenblatt, Aarau, 1924.
- Jugend und Frauenstimmrecht. 1929.
- Wie erziehen wir junge Mädchen zur Arbeitsfreude. Schweizerischer Frauenkalender, 1933.
- Der schweizerische Staatsgedanke im Sturm der Zeit. Schweizerische Lehrerinnen-Zeitung, 1934.
- Was jede Schweizerfrau von der Entwicklung unserer Demokratie wissen sollte. Jahrbuch der Schweizerfrau, 1935.
- Die Vereinten Nationen und die Schweiz. Zentralblatt, 1946.
- Das Ringen um die Menschenrechte. Bund, 1947.
- Eine Amerika-Reise. Zentralblatt, 1948.
- Schweizerschule und Völkerverständigung. Schweizerische Lehrerzeitung, 1950.
- Das Ziel des Verbandes der Berufs- und Geschäftsfrauen in internationaler Sicht. 1953.
- Die politische Gleichberechtigung der Frau als weltpolitische Aufgabe. Eidgenössischer Nationalkalender, 1954.

== Bibliography ==
- Marthe Gosteli (ed.): Vergessene Geschichte – Histoire oubliée: Illustrierte Chronik der Frauenbewegung 1914–1963. Chronique illustrée du mouvement féministe 1914–1963. 2 volumes. Stämpfli Verlag, Bern, 2000, ISBN 3-7272-9256-3.
- Magda Neuweiler et al.: Im Gedenken an Dr. phil. Ida Somazzi. Somazzi Foundation, 1963.
- Franziska Rogger: Somazzi, Ida. In: Neue Deutsche Biographie (NDB). Volume 24, Duncker & Humblot, Berlin 2010, ISBN 978-3-428-11205-0, p. 560 f. (digital copy).
- Franziska Rogger Kappeler: "Ida Somazzi" in German, French and Italian in the online Historical Dictionary of Switzerland, 2012-12-20.
