= Lotti Ruckstuhl =

Swiss lawyer and suffragist (1901–1988)

- Born: Charlotte Thalmessinger; 2 May 1901; Ulm, German Empire
- Died: 8 June 1988 (aged 87); St. Gallen, Switzerland
- Other name: Lotti Ruckstuhl-Thalmessinger
- Education: University of Zurich
- Occupation: Lawyer
- Spouse: Friedrich Ruckstuhl
- Parents: Viktor Thalmessinger (father); Katharina Michel (mother)
- Awards: Ida Somazzi Prize (1978)

Lotti Ruckstuhl (born Charlotte Thalmessinger; also Lotti Thalmessinger or Lotti Ruckstuhl-Thalmessinger; 2 May 1901 – 8 June 1988) was a Swiss lawyer and campaigner for women's suffrage. A member of the Swiss Catholic Women's League (SKF) from 1933, she worked to open it to political questions and represented it on federal commissions. As president of the Swiss Association for Women's Suffrage from 1960 to 1968, she made her mark through her skillful handling of the media.

== Biography ==
Lotti Thalmessinger was born on 2 May 1901 in Ulm, the daughter of Viktor Thalmessinger, a physician, and Katharina née Michel. She spent her childhood in South Africa. After her Matura in Zurich she studied law and economics at the University of Zurich, obtained her doctorate in 1930 and was admitted to the bar (Anwaltspatent) in 1933. She was a court trainee (Auditorin) at the Zurich district court, and from 1933 to 1937 she was legal adviser to the sales office of the Swiss paper mills (Verkaufsstelle Schweizerischer Papierfabriken). She married Friedrich Ruckstuhl, a physician.

From 1933 Ruckstuhl was a member of the Swiss Catholic Women's League (SKF), where she worked to open the league to political questions; in 1948 she initiated its legal commission (Juristische Kommission). She represented the SKF on the federal commission of experts for the revision of family law from 1957 to 1965, and on the federal finance commission from 1969 to 1973. In 1958 she worked on the Swiss Exhibition for Women's Work (Saffa).

As president of the Swiss Association for Women's Suffrage from 1960 to 1968, Ruckstuhl made her mark through her skillful handling of the media. In 1978 she received the Ida Somazzi Prize. She died on 8 June 1988 in St. Gallen.

== Works ==
- Frauen sprengen Fesseln. Hindernislauf zum Frauenstimmrecht in der Schweiz, 1986

== Bibliography ==
- Neue Zürcher Zeitung, 10 June 1988 (obituary)

=== Archives ===
- Gosteli Foundation archive, Worblaufen, biographical notes
