= Choisy =

Choisy may refer to:

- Choisy-le-Roi, a commune of the Val-de-Marne département, France
  - Choisy Cathedral in Choisy-le-Roi
  - Château de Choisy a demolished royal palace at Choisy-le-Roi
- Choisy, Haute-Savoie, a commune of the Haute-Savoie département, France
- Choisy-en-Brie, a commune of the Seine-et-Marne département, France
- Porte de Choisy station, a Paris Metro station
- Choisy-au-Bac, a commune of the Oise département, France
- Choisy-la-Victoire, a commune of the Oise département, France

== People with the family name ==
- François-Timoléon de Choisy (1644–1724), French author
- Jacques Denys Choisy (1799–1859), Swiss botanist whose standard author abbreviation is Choisy
- Auguste Choisy (1841–1909), French architectural historian and educator
- Alix Choisy-Necker (1902–1979), Swiss suffragist
- Maryse Choisy (1903–1979), French philosophical writer
- Maurice Gustave Benoit Choisy (1897–1966, M. Choisy), mycologist and lichenologist
