= Trudi Witta =

Swiss socialist politician and women's suffrage activist (1908–2002)

- Born: Gertrud Marie Humm; 13 October 1908; Olten, Solothurn, Switzerland
- Died: 15 November 2002 (aged 94); Olten, Solothurn, Switzerland
- Occupations: Politician, activist
- Political party: Social Democratic Party of Switzerland
- Spouse: Max Witta
- Children: 4 (3 survived to adulthood)

Trudi Witta (born Gertrud Marie Humm; 13 October 1908 – 15 November 2002) was a Swiss socialist politician and activist who played a central role in the campaign for women's suffrage in Switzerland. She served in numerous leadership positions within the socialist movement and women's organizations in the Canton of Solothurn and was instrumental in maintaining political support for women's voting rights from the 1940s through its eventual adoption in 1971.

== Early life and family ==
Trudi Witta was born as Gertrud Marie Humm in Olten to Rudolf Humm, a train conductor with the Swiss Federal Railways, and Marie Humm (née Engimann), a housewife. She was the eldest of four children in a politically active family. Her father was a trade unionist and president of the Olten section of the Swiss Railway Workers' Union, while her mother co-founded the Olten Women Workers' Association and served as secretary of the Union of Proletarian Women of Solothurn canton.

After completing primary and secondary education, Witta trained as a milliner, graduating with distinction. She became politically engaged at an early age, joining the Young Socialists organization. In 1927, she married Max Witta, a teacher and socialist politician who served as a municipal councillor and deputy mayor (Statthalter) of Olten for many years. The couple had four children, three of whom survived to adulthood. From 1946, they lived in their own house and mutually supported each other's political activities.

== Political career ==
Due to employment restrictions that prevented civil servants' wives from working, Witta could not practice her trade as a milliner after marriage. Instead, she pursued continuing education courses in politics and became deeply involved in public service and political organizations.

From 1936, Witta served on the Olten kindergarten commission, which she chaired during the 1950s. During World War II, she was particularly active in the Swiss Workers' Relief Organization (Oseo). She held various leadership positions within the Social Democratic Party of Switzerland (SP) and the women's movement, including secretary (from 1942), vice-president (from 1952), and president (1960–1971) of the women's section of the Olten SP.

At the cantonal level, Witta served as secretary (1942–1945) and president (1945–1971) of the Socialist Women of Solothurn. She sat on the executive committee of the Olten SP and, from 1950 to 1971, on the executive committee of the SP of Solothurn canton. She was a member of the Central Women's Commission of the Swiss Socialist Women and served for seven years as vice-president of the Union for the Advancement of Women's Causes in Olten.

Witta also served on the executive committee of the Liaison Center of Women's Associations of Solothurn and the executive committee of the Pressunion Frauenrecht cooperative, which published the magazine Die Frau in Leben und Arbeit. She was among the first women from Solothurn to serve on a court of assizes and sat on various commissions, including that of the Solothurn cantonal hospital from 1954 to 1977.

=== Women's suffrage activism ===
Witta's primary political objective was the introduction of women's suffrage in Switzerland. Despite facing hostile reactions and criticism, she worked tirelessly for years to build support for this cause across party lines. Under her leadership, the socialist women's movement successfully reintroduced women's voting rights into the cantonal party program after 1945, following the issue's abandonment in the late 1920s. Although the introduction of women's suffrage at the cantonal level narrowly failed at the polls in 1948, it sparked the first broad public debate on the issue in Solothurn canton. Before the federal votes of 1959 and 1971, Witta played an essential role in mobilizing supporters through her public positions and extensive network.

In 1959, she worked closely with radical physician Maria Felchlin, who was also a member of the executive committee of the Union for the Advancement of Women's Causes in Olten. After the acceptance of women's suffrage in 1971, Witta chose not to run for municipal executive office in Olten due to her age but remained politically active.

== Death and legacy ==
Trudi Witta died on 15 November 2002 in Olten at the age of 94. Her decades-long commitment to women's suffrage and socialist politics in Solothurn made her a significant figure in Swiss women's political history, particularly in the long campaign that ultimately secured voting rights for Swiss women in 1971.

== Bibliography ==
- Oettli, Mascha (1968). "Trudi Witta zum sechzigsten Geburtstag". Die Frau in Leben und Arbeit. 40 (10): 5.
- Lätt, Jean-Maurice (1990). 120 Jahre Arbeiterbewegung des Kantons Solothurn. Für eine demokratische und solidarische Welt. pp. 286–294.
- "Obituaries and articles". Oltner Tagblatt. 28 July 1994, 18 September 1995, 12 December 2002.
