= Limmat Verlag =

Swiss publishing house

- Founded: 1975
- Successor: Limmat Verlag
- Country of origin: Switzerland
- Headquarters location: Zürich
- Key people: Jürg Zimmerli, Erwin Künzli, Trix Krebs
- Publication types: non-fiction books
- Fiction genres: progressive/critical history and politics, women in history, politics and culture
- Official website: www.limmatverlag.ch

Limmat Verlag is a Swiss publishing house, headquartered at Quellenstrasse 25, 8003 Zürich, Switzerland. Founded in 1975 in Zürich, it is specialized in political history.

== History and publishing fields ==
A group of young historians documented the history of the Swiss labor movement, but their publication had failed at two publishers, which is why the team of authors decided to do it themselves and established their own publishing house. Limmat Verlag, named after the local river Limmat, was founded on 19 March 1975 as Limmat Verlag Genossenschaft, a cooperative that was registered in the Swiss commercial register, based in Zürich nearby Zürichhorn in its early years. Its first publication was Schweizerische Arbeiterbewegung, a documentation that still is handled as a standard reference work related to the Swiss labour movement. Among the founding members were Hans Jürg Fehr, Pierre Bachofner, Heidi Witzig, Heiner Spiess (1948-2006), Jacques von Moos, Jean-Pierre Kuster and Peter Aeberli. Publications included a series of non-fiction books about historical and political issues that significantly determine the publishing program and the image of the publishing in public. According to the publisher of particular importance are books on women's lives, women's history and gender issues.

The literary program comprises books of Laure Wyss, Isolde Schaad, Niklaus Meienberg, Dieter Bachmann, Simona Ryser, Maja Peter, Emil Zopfi, Peter Höner, and in 1989, the last work of Max Frisch: Schweiz ohne Armee? Ein Palaver ("Switzerland without an army?) in German and Romansh language. Poetry is represented by an increasing number of bilingual editions from lyricist in Italian, Romansh, French, Spanish and other languages, and the 2013 anthology "Moderne Poesie in der Schweiz" edited by Roger Perret. Other works include Friedrich Glauser's detective stories, the collected works of Alexander Xaver Gwerder and Walter Gross, as well as other Swiss "classics" by Charles-Ferdinand Ramuz in the German translations, Meinrad Ingle and Plinio Martini. Limmat Verlag regularly publishes translations of authors from French and Italian speaking Switzerland, and Romansh literature. For these efforts related to the verbal communication between the linguistic regions in Switzerland, Limmat Verlag was awarded by the Oertli Stiftung in 1994. Meanwhile, translations from languages of the so-called fifth Switzerland have been published, among them two books by the Russian author Mikhail Shishkin, poetry books in Albanian, Hungarian, Friulian, Italian and Spanish, always in bilingual editions, as well as the German language works of the Kurdish author Yusuf Yesilöz. The publisher's program includes also biographies and autobiographies of known and unknown Swiss people, for instance, Gertrud Mosimann, Paula Charles, Adeline Favre, Fritz Brupbacher, Regula Engel, Anny Klawa-Morf, Max Frisch, Niklaus Meienberg, Laure Wyss, Vladimir Rosenbaum and Aline Valangin, Amalie and Theo Pinkus. In co-operation with the Swiss Society of Folklore, Limmat Verlag published the series "Das volkskundliche Taschenbuch" (the folklore paperback), and the publishing house distributes also the Josef Burri's photo books, or historical collections, related among others to the Italian migration to Switzerland, and the entire collection of children's photographs of Emil Brunner. Further art books complement the publishing program. Limmat Verlag is the main publisher of Swiss-Iraqi author Usama Al Shahmani.

== Trivia ==
Since its early days, the publisher housed also the labour history's library Studienbibliothek zur Geschichte der Arbeiterbewegung. In 2000 the library was given to the Zentralbibliothek Zürich.

== See also ==
- Rotpunktverlag
