= Hermann Boeschenstein =

Hermann Boeschenstein or Hermann Böschenstein may refer to:

- Hermann Boeschenstein (Germanist) (1900–1982), Swiss-Canadian scholar of German studies
- Hermann Böschenstein (journalist) (1905–1997), Swiss journalist
