= Ida Somazzi Prize =

Swiss prize for education, peace, human rights, and gender equality

- Awarded for: Education, peace, freedom, human rights, human dignity, and gender equality
- Sponsored by: Somazzi Foundation
- Location: Bern, Switzerland
- Country: Switzerland
- Presented by: Somazzi Foundation
- First award: 1966

The Ida Somazzi Prize is a Swiss award established in 1966 to honor individuals and organizations working in the fields of education and training, peace and freedom, human rights and human dignity, as well as gender equality. The prize is awarded almost annually by the Somazzi Foundation (known as the Dr. Ida Somazzi Foundation until 2011), based in Bern.

== History ==
The foundation was established in 1964 by the Swiss Working Group "Woman and Democracy" in memory of women's rights activist Ida Somazzi. The foundation's finances were largely supported by a donation from Maria Felchlin, a physician from Olten.

The Swiss Working Group "Woman and Democracy" was a non-partisan association composed of individual members and women's organizations, founded in 1933 in response to the rise of fascism in Italy and National Socialism in Germany. After World War II, the organization was reorganized and, until its dissolution in 1998, focused primarily on civic and political education for women, as well as the fight against communism as part of Switzerland's spiritual defense efforts. Ida Somazzi, one of the key figures in the organization's founding alongside feminist activist Maria Fierz, served as its president from 1949 to 1963 and played a crucial role in its post-war reorganization.

== Recipients list ==
The following individuals and organizations have received the Ida Somazzi Prize:

- 1966: Alice Meyer
- 1968: Edgar Bonjour
- 1968: Verena Marty
- 1969: Fritz Wartenweiler
- 1970: Jeanne Hersch
- 1971: Helene Thalmann-Antenen
- 1973: Gerda Stocker-Meyer
- 1974: Peter Sager
- 1975: Suzanne Oswald
- 1976: Betty Wehrli-Knobel
- 1977: Elsie Attenhofer
- 1978: Lotti Ruckstuhl
- 1979: Hermann Böschenstein
- 1981: Lili Nabholz-Haidegger
- 1983: Gertrude Girard-Montet
- 1985: Marie Boehlen
- 1985: François Bondy
- 1988: Mariella Mehr
- 1989: Inge Sprenger Viol
- 1992: Gertrud Heinzelmann
- 1995: Tula Roy, Gitta Gsell, and Josi Meier
- 1996: Branka Goldstein
- 1997: Hélène Charmillot-Vonlanthen
- 1999: FrauenMusikForum FMF
- 2000: Liliana Heimberg
- 2001: Gret Haller
- 2001: Editrices d'Olympe. Feministische Arbeitshefte zur Politik
- 2004: Fraueninformationszentrum Zürich FIZ
- 2005: Inga Vatter Jensen
- 2006: 1000 Femmes pour le prix Nobel de la paix 2005
- 2007: Elsbeth Pulver
- 2007: Katharina von Salis
- 2010: Arbeitsgruppe Berner Architektinnen und Planerinnen ABAP
- 2011: Zainap Gaschaeva
- 2012: Michèle Roten
- 2013: Yin Yuzhen
- 2014: Steff La Cheffe
- 2015: Verein Netzwerk Asyl Aargau
- 2016: Tove Soiland
- 2017: Amal Naser
- 2018: Infra Bern
- 2019: Bla*sh

== Bibliography ==
- Stocker-Meyer, Gerda: Die Schweizerische Arbeitsgemeinschaft «Frau und Demokratie». Von ihrer Geschichte, ihrem Standort, ihrer Arbeit, 1984.
