= Beatrix Mesmer =

Swiss historian (1931–2015)

Beatrix Mesmer-Strupp (2 June 1931, in Munich – 24 September 2015, in Bern) was a Swiss historian of German origin. She was one of the first female Swiss professors, being a professor of Swiss history at the University of Bern from 1973 to 1996. Her research and work on Swiss women's history has had a considerable impact on the subject.

== Life and career ==
Mesmer was born on 2 June 1931 in Munich, and was half-Jewish. In 1938, her family fled to Switzerland after Kristallnacht, and in 1941 she became stateless. She grew up in Seeland, where she would attend school up through high school. She was often called "Sauschwob" in school due to her German accent. Mesmer attended the University of Bern and the Free University of Berlin, where she studied art history and media. In 1952, she married a school teacher and became a Swiss citizen. She gave birth to their son in the same year. Around this time, Mesmer worked as an assistant editor for the Swiss Telegraphic Agency.

In 1959, Mesmer became an assistant at the University of Bern. In 1961, she received a doctorate from this university. In 1972, she earned habilitation, with a thesis on early pre-marxist socialist financial policies. From 1973 to 1996, Mesmer was a professor of Swiss history at the University of Bern. She became the Dean of the Faculty of Philosophy in 1978, and from 1989 to 1992 was the first Vice Rector and in turn the first woman to be part of the University of Bern management. During this time, she became the president of the Swiss History Society, becoming the first woman in this position.

Mesmer's research was mainly in the fields of social history, the history of mentalities, and gender history. She was a co-editor of History of Switzerland and the Swiss, a three-volume standard work published in the 1980s. In 1988 she published the literary work Frauen und Frauenorganisationen in der Schweiz des 19. Jahrhunderts (Women and women organizations in Switzerland in the 19th century). In 2007, she published Staatsbürgerinnen ohne Stimmrecht. Die Politik der schweizerischen Frauenverbände 1914–1971. Both of these works had a significant impact on Swiss women's history, although Mesmer never identified as a feminist. She never considered herself to have been discriminated against, which may have been helped by her status at the university.

Mesmer had a hand in the development of the Historical Dictionary of Switzerland, where she was a member of the Foundation Council Committee. In this position, she gave expert examination to individual articles.

Mesmer was a member of the Swiss Science Council and the Research Council of the Swiss National Science Foundation. She was also a founding member of the National Commission for the Publication of Diplomatic Documents in Switzerland.

In 2011, Mesmer, with Marthe Gosteli, was awarded the human rights prize from the International Society for Human Rights, for her work on the subject of women's rights.
