= Emma Pieczynska-Reichenbach =

Swiss women's rights activist and abolitionist

- Emma Pieczynska-Reichenbach, 1900
- Born: 19 April 1854; Paris, France
- Died: 10 February 1927 (aged 72); Le Mont-sur-Lausanne, Switzerland
- Education: University of Geneva
- Spouse(s): Stanislas Pieczynski, ending in divorce

Emma Pieczynska-Reichenbach (19 April 1854 – 10 February 1927) was a Swiss abolitionist and feminist born in Paris, France. She was orphaned at 5 years old, and grew up with foster families in Geneva and Neuchâtel. When she was old enough, she travelled to Paris, where she met and married the intellectual Stanislas Pieczynski. In 1875 she followed him to Poland. Horrified by the lack of education of women there, she began at once to teach reading and writing. In 1881 she turned back to help people in Switzerland. In Leukerbad she learned from the American doctor and suffragette Harriet Clisby, who familiarized her with the women's rights movement.

She then got a divorce, and attended the University of Geneva to study medicine. In 1889 she traveled to the United States, where she became familiar with the organized women's right movement. In 1891 she went back to Switzerland and studied further. In Bern she met Helene von Mülinen, who would become her life partner. She took part in the first Swiss Congress for the Interests of Women in Geneva. By this time her health had degraded enough that she had gone deaf, preventing her from receiving a doctorate. Her thesis, a work on sexual education, was first published in 1898 under the title L'école de la pureté (The School of the Pure).

Around the same time she met Josephine Butler, the founder of the International Abolitionist Federation, a group attempting to end prostitution. In 1891 she founded the first Swiss ethics organization (sittlichkeitsverein), the Union des femmes de Genève (Union of the Women in Geneva). Together with Mülinen she founded the Bund Schweizerischer Frauenvereine in 1900. In 1906 she helped establish the Swiss Consumer League, and in 1915 she participated in the National Education Commission. She died in early 1927 in Mont-sur-Lausanne.

== Works ==
- L'école de la pureté, 1898
