= Betty Wehrli-Knobel =

Swiss journalist and writer (1904–1998)

- Born: Babetta Knobel; 13 July 1904; Zussigen, Haslen, Switzerland
- Died: 13 February 1998 (aged 93); Brissago, Switzerland
- Other name: Betty Knobel
- Occupations: Journalist; writer; editor
- Spouse: Paul Wehrli (m. 1936; died 1945)
- Parents: Melchior Knobel (father); Verena Zweifel (mother)
- Awards: Ida Somazzi Prize (1976)

Betty Wehrli-Knobel (born Babetta Knobel; also Betty Knobel or Betty Wehrli; 13 July 1904 – 13 February 1998) was a Swiss journalist and writer. She was editor-in-chief of the Bündnerin from 1939 to 1959, of Schweizerischer Kindergarten from 1951 to 1972 and of the Schweizer Frauenblatt from 1956 to 1961, and from 1951 she lived in Zurich as a freelance journalist. Her books Frauen in unserem Land (1970) and Mit Frauen im Gespräch (1974) are documents of the women's movement.

== Biography ==
Betty Knobel was born on 13 July 1904 in Zussigen, in the municipality of Haslen (now part of Glarus Süd), the daughter of Melchior Knobel, a clerk, and Verena née Zweifel. She attended a commercial school in Neuchâtel and trained as a journalist in London. In 1936 she married Paul Wehrli, an engineer, who died in 1945.

From 1931 to 1936 Knobel was a career counselor and vocational school teacher in Glarus. From 1935 she wrote stories and biographies and contributed to newspapers. She was editor-in-chief of the Bündnerin, a supplement of the Neue Bündner Zeitung, from 1939 to 1959, of Schweizerischer Kindergarten from 1951 to 1972 and of the Schweizer Frauenblatt from 1956 to 1961. From 1951 Wehrli-Knobel lived in Zurich as a freelance journalist, and she often published under her maiden name, Knobel.

Her books Frauen in unserem Land (1970) and Mit Frauen im Gespräch (1974) are documents of the women's movement. She received an honorary award (Ehrengabe) from the city of Zurich in 1959 and the Ida Somazzi Prize in 1976. In 1987 she became a member of the PEN Club. She died on 13 February 1998 in Brissago.

== Bibliography ==
- D. Stump et al., Deutschsprachige Schriftstellerinnen in der Schweiz 1700–1945, 1994, 117–119 (with a list of works)

=== Archives ===
- Gosteli Foundation, Worblaufen, biographical collection
