= Mariella Mehr =

Swiss writer (1947–2022)

- Born: 26 December 1947 Zürich, Switzerland
- Died: 5 September 2022 (aged 74) Zürich, Switzerland
- Occupation: Novelist
- Language: German

Mariella Mehr (26 December 1947 – 5 September 2022) was a Swiss novelist, playwright, and poet. She was born a member of the itinerant Yeniche people, but was separated from her family by the program Kinder der Landstrasse, and raised in institutions and by foster parents. Her first novel, Steinzeit, with autobiographical elements, appeared in 1981. She championed the causes of outsiders and oppressed minorities. She received various awards and an honorary doctorate from the University of Basel for her work.

== Life ==
Mehr was born on 26 December 1947 (or 27 December 1947) in Zürich as a member of the itinerant Yeniche people. She was affected by the program Kinder der Landstrasse, a project which tried to assimilate Yenish children by separating them from their families. Mehr was taken away from her mother at a young age and lived in orphanages and with foster parents. She was moved between 16 orphanages and three reformatories as a child, attending three schools. She made money as a factory worker. She became pregnant at age 18. After she gave birth, her son was taken away. She was held at Hindelbank women's prison for 19 months and forcibly sterilised.

From 1974 onwards, Mehr wrote several articles criticising the racism of Kinder der Landstrasse. She published her first literary work in 1975. Her first novel, Steinzeit (Stone Age), which contained autobiographical elements, appeared in 1981. Her books frequently deal with or depict the causes of outsiders and oppressed minorities.

The title of her 1986 play Akte M. Xenos ill.* 1947 – Akte C. Xenos ill.* 1966 is the title of her dossier at Kinder der Landstrasse. It premiered at the Theater 1230 in Bern in 1986. Mehr documented strong reactions in her 1987 book about the play and the programme, Kinder der Landstrasse: Ein Hilfswerk, ein Theater und die Folgen (Children of the Country Road: A Charity, a Theatre and the Consequences). Her drama Silvia Z. was motivated by the 1980 youth riots in Zürich. It premiered the same year at the Stadttheater Chur. Another 1986 drama, Anni B., is focused on a woman who fought as a member of the International Brigades in Spain and was placed in a mental institution when she returned to Switzerland. It was performed at the Theaterhaus Gessnerallee in Zürich in 1991, but without the author's consent; she thought that her text had been changed too much.

Mehr moved to Tuscany in 1996. In 2000, she resigned from the authors' club Gruppe Olten because the group had removed the goal of realising a democratic socialist society from its mission statement. She was a founding member of the International Romani Writers' Association (IRWA) in 2002, and served as its vice president for some time.

She returned to Switzerland in 2015, settling in Zürich. She died in the Entlisberg nursing home in Zürich on 5 September 2022 at age 74.

== Bibliography ==
=== Books ===
Mehr's books include:

- Das Sternbild des Wolfes. Klagenfurt: Drava. 2003. ISBN 978-3-85435-412-3.
- Angeklagt. Zürich: Nagel & Kimche. 2002. ISBN 978-3-312-00294-8.
- Widerwelten. Klagenfurt: Drava. 2001. ISBN 978-3-85435-365-2.
- Brandzauber. Zürich: Nagel & Kimche. 1998. ISBN 978-3-312-00237-5.
- Nachrichten aus dem Exil. Klagenfurt: Drava. 1998. ISBN 978-3-85435-296-9.
- Daskind. Zürich: Nagel & Kimche. 1995. ISBN 978-3-312-00210-8.
- Zeus, oder, Der Zwillingston. Zürich: Edition R F. 1994. ISBN 978-3-9520576-0-5.
- RückBlitze. Berne: Zytglogge. 1990. ISBN 978-3-7296-0356-1.
- Steinzeit. Berne: Zytglogge. 1990. ISBN 978-3-7296-0125-3.
- Kinder der Landstrasse: ein Hilfswerk, ein Theater und die Folgen. Berne: Zytglogge. 1987. ISBN 978-3-7296-0264-9.
- Das Licht der Frau. Berne: Zytglogge. 1984. ISBN 978-3-7296-0198-7.
- In diesen Traum schlendert ein roter Findling. Berne: Zytglogge. 1983. ISBN 978-3-7296-0170-3.

=== Stage works ===
Mehr wrote three plays:

- Kinder der Landstrasse, drama, 1986
- Silvia Z. Ein Requiem., drama, 1986
- Anni B. oder Die fünf Gesänge der Not, drama, 1989

== Awards ==
Mehr was awarded the literary prize of the Kanton Zürich, and the literary prize of Berne in both 1983 and 1987. In 1988, Mehr received the Ida Somazzi Prize for her engagement in the interests of women. She was awarded the prize of the Swiss Schillerstiftung in 1996.

Mehr's literary and social work was recognized in 1998 with an honorary doctorate from the University of Basel. In 2012, she was the first recipient of the ProLitteris award for a literary life's work. She was awarded the Bündner Literaturpreis in 2016.
