= Helene von Mülinen =

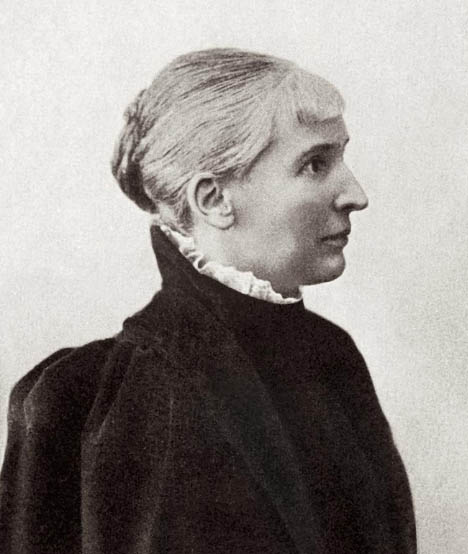
- Helene von Mülinen, 1897
- Born: 27 November 1850; Bern, Switzerland
- Died: 11 March 1924 (aged 73); Bern, Switzerland
- Occupation: Suffragist
- Partner: Emma Pieczynska-Reichenbac

Helene von Mülinen (27 November 1850 – 11 March 1924) was a Swiss feminist regarded as the founder of the organized Swiss women's suffrage movement. She founded the Swiss women's suffrage organization Bund Schweizerischer Frauenvereine (BSF) in 1900 and served as its first president between 1900 and 1904.

== Biography ==
Mülinen was born in Bern, Switzerland, on 27 November 1850. Her family was part of the Swiss nobility. Although her parents prevented her from receiving a formal theological degree, von Mülinen audited lectures at the University of Bern, including lectures by Adolf Schlatter and Fritz Barth.

In 1890, Mülinen became hospitalized for treatment for tuberculosis. There, she became acquainted with the medical student Emma Pieczynska-Reichenbach. The two became life-long partners, committed to the women's movement.

Mülinen participated in the formation of the Bund Schweizerischer Frauenvereine (Federation of Swiss Women's Associations) and served as its president from 1900 through 1904. She also remained on the board through 1920.

Mülinen died on 11 March 1924 in Bern.

== See also ==
- List of suffragists and suffragettes
- Women's suffrage in Switzerland
