= Elsbeth Pulver =

Swiss literary critic (1928–2017)

- Born: Elsbeth Spring; 21 April 1928; Zweisimmen, Bern, Switzerland
- Died: 18 July 2017 (aged 89); Bern, Switzerland
- Occupations: Teacher; literary critic
- Spouse: Urs Pulver (m. 1955)
- Parents: Hans Spring (father); Rosa Kühni (mother)
- Awards: Ida Somazzi Prize (2007)

Elsbeth Pulver (née Spring; 21 April 1928 – 18 July 2017) was a Swiss literary critic. A secondary school teacher in Bern, from 1981 she worked as a freelance critic, reviewing new Swiss literature for newspapers and magazines, and she edited works by Robert Walser, Josef Viktor Widmann and Kurt Marti, among others.

== Biography ==
Elsbeth Spring was born on 21 April 1928 in Zweisimmen, the daughter of Hans Spring, a stationmaster, and Rosa Kühni, a hotelier. In 1955 she married Urs Pulver, the son of Paul Pulver, director of the teacher training school (Lehramtsschule) in Bern.

Pulver studied German and history in Bern and obtained a doctorate. She taught at a Gymnasium (academic secondary school) in Bern and from 1981 worked as a freelance literary critic. She reviewed new Swiss literature for publications such as the Neue Zürcher Zeitung, the Berner Zeitung and the Schweizer Monatshefte, and edited the works of Robert Walser, Josef Viktor Widmann and Kurt Marti, among others. In 2007 she received the Ida Somazzi Prize. She died in Bern on 18 July 2017.

== Works ==
- "Die deutschsprachige Literatur der Schweiz", in Kindlers Literaturgeschichte der Gegenwart, vol. 4, 1974
- Marie Luise Kaschnitz, 1984

== Archives ==
- Swiss Literary Archives
