= Gertrude Girard-Montet =

Swiss politician (1913–1989)

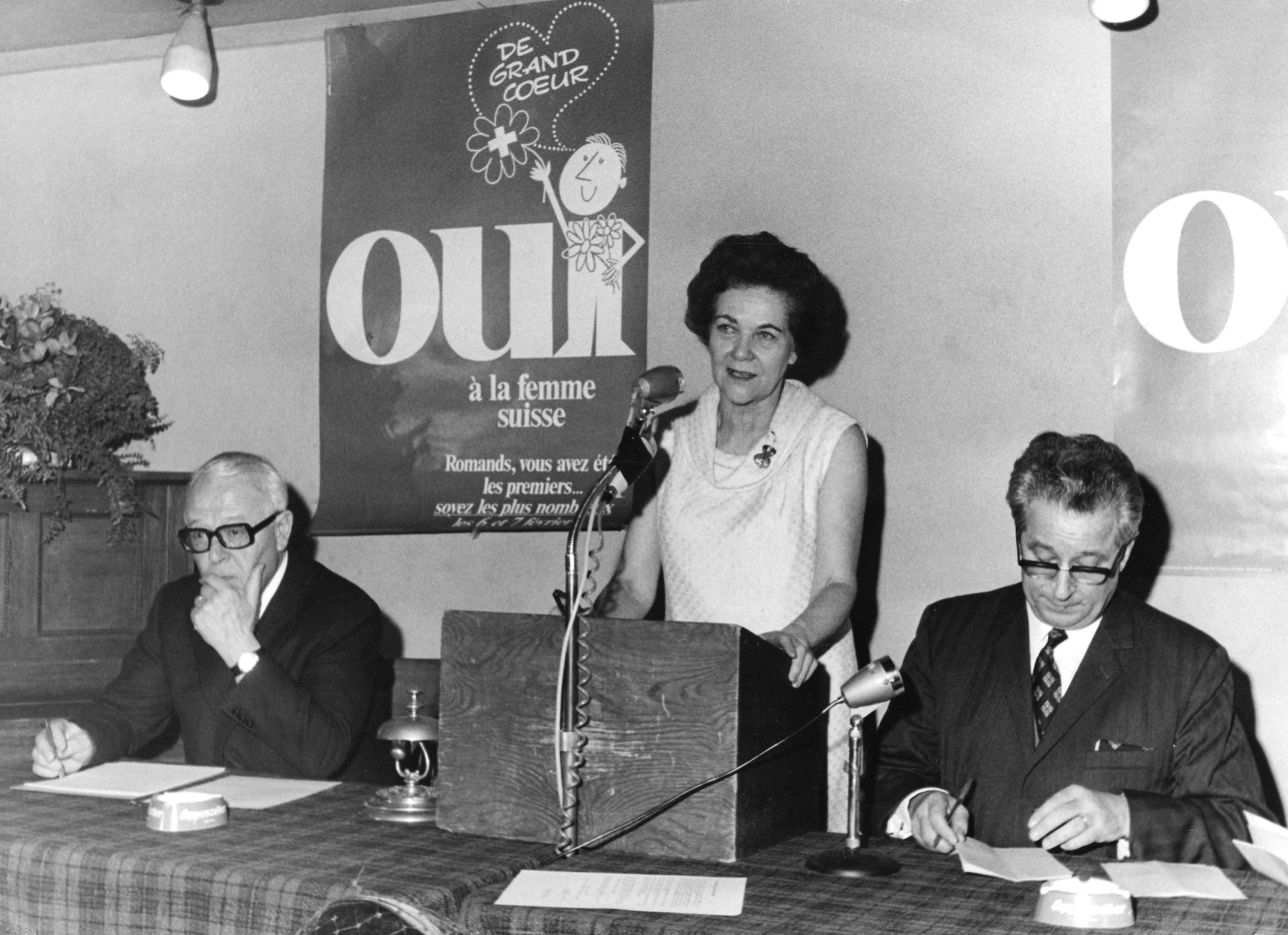
- Girard-Montet (center) with Federal Councillor Pierre Graber (left) and Edouard Debétaz, vice-president of the Vaud government, on 1 February 1971
- Born: Gertrude Montet; 9 January 1913; La Tour-de-Peilz, Switzerland
- Died: 25 November 1989 (aged 76); Vevey, Switzerland
- Other name: Gertrude Montet Girard
- Occupation: Politician
- Spouse: Pierre Girard (m. 1936)
- Parents: Frédéric Montet (father); Fanny Murisier (mother)
- Awards: Ida Somazzi Prize (1983)

Gertrude Girard-Montet (born Gertrude Montet; also Gertrude Girard; from 1988 Gertrude Montet Girard; 9 January 1913 – 25 November 1989) was a Swiss campaigner for women's suffrage and politician from the canton of Vaud. From 1968 to 1977 she was central president of the Swiss Association for Women's Suffrage, which under her leadership protested in 1968 against the signing of the European Convention on Human Rights with a reservation on account of women's lack of political rights. She sat in the National Council for the Free Democratic Party from 1974 to 1983.

== Biography ==
Gertrude Montet was born on 9 January 1913 in La Tour-de-Peilz, the daughter of Frédéric Montet, a master chimney sweep, and Fanny née Murisier. She grew up in a liberal family and spent a period of study in Paris. In 1936 she married Pierre Girard, the owner of a house-painting business, and after her marriage she worked in her husband's firm. In the 1960s she worked for Radio Suisse Romande and wrote regular contributions for the magazine Femmes suisses et le mouvement féministe.

Girard-Montet was active in the suffrage movement from 1957, and from 1960 to 1968 she led the cantonal federation of the Vaud women's suffrage associations. From 1968 to 1977 she was central president of the Swiss Association for Women's Suffrage, which was renamed the Swiss Association for Women's Rights (Schweizerischer Verband für Frauenrechte) in 1971. Under her leadership the association protested in 1968 against the signing of the European Convention on Human Rights, because the report of the Federal Council provided for a reservation on account of women's lack of political rights. This intervention sped up the drafting of a new proposal for a vote on the introduction of women's suffrage, in which the association also took part. Ahead of the vote of 7 February 1971, Girard-Montet was active in the action committee supporting the proposal.

As a woman of Vaud, Girard-Montet had the right to vote and stand for election in cantonal and communal matters from 1959, and in 1961 she was elected to the municipal parliament of La Tour-de-Peilz. In 1971 she stood for the National Council on the list of the Free Democratic Party (FDP). She entered the council as a substitute in 1974, was re-elected twice and stepped down in 1983. In the National Council she was mainly concerned with economic and social policy. From 1975 to 1983 she was a member of the parliamentary delegation to the Council of Europe. In 1976 she was elected president of the Federal Commission against Alcoholism (Eidgenössische Kommission gegen den Alkoholismus).

For her services in the struggle for political equality, Girard-Montet received the Ida Somazzi Prize in 1983. In 1988 she changed her name from Girard-Montet to Montet Girard. She died on 25 November 1989 in Vevey.

== Bibliography ==
- Nouvelle Revue de Lausanne, 28 November 1989 (obituary)
- Femmes suisses et le mouvement féministe, 1990/1, 5 (obituary)

=== Archives ===
- Swiss Social Archives, Zurich, records of the Swiss Association for Women's Rights (Schweizerischer Verband für Frauenrechte, Association suisse pour les droits de la femme)
