= Alix Choisy-Necker =

Swiss suffragist (1902–1979)

- Born: Alix Necker; 17 July 1902; Geneva, Switzerland
- Died: 11 January 1979 (aged 76); Satigny, Switzerland
- Occupation: Women's suffrage campaigner
- Spouse: Eric Choisy
- Parents: Henri Necker (father); Reyne Marguerite de Candolle (mother)

Alix Choisy-Necker (born Alix Necker; also Alix Choisy; 17 July 1902 – 11 January 1979) was a Swiss campaigner for women's suffrage from Geneva. She was central president of the Swiss Association for Women's Suffrage from 1952 to 1959 and president of the Geneva Women's Union (Union des Femmes de Genève) from 1960 to 1968.

== Biography ==
Alix Necker was born on 17 July 1902 in Geneva, the daughter of Henri Necker, a banker, and Reyne Marguerite née de Candolle. She grew up in an upper-middle-class milieu (grossbürgerliche Verhältnisse). She married Eric Choisy.

From 1938 Choisy-Necker was a member of the Geneva Women's Union, which she presided over from 1960 to 1968. A committed campaigner for women's suffrage, in 1952 she led the action committee for the trial vote (Probeabstimmung) among the women of Geneva on the introduction of women's suffrage. After cantonal women's suffrage was rejected in 1953, she took part in the protest meeting in Geneva.

From 1952 to 1959 Choisy-Necker was central president of the Swiss Association for Women's Suffrage, and she worked on the action committee for the vote of 1 February 1959. From 1957 to 1965 she was a member of the suffrage commission of the Federation of Swiss Women's Associations (BSF). Besides this, she worked mainly in the field of maternity protection. She died on 11 January 1979 in Satigny.

== Bibliography ==
- Femmes suisses, no. 2, 1979
- Schweizer Frauenblatt, no. 2, 1979
