= Gerda Stocker-Meyer =

Swiss journalist (1912–1997)

- Born: Gerda Meyer; 26 August 1912; Spiez, Switzerland
- Died: 19 November 1997 (aged 85); Toffen, Switzerland
- Education: University of Bern
- Occupation: Journalist
- Spouse: Arnold Stocker
- Parents: Reinhard Meyer (father); Betty Rein (mother)
- Awards: Ida Somazzi Prize (1973)

Gerda Stocker-Meyer (born Gerda Meyer; also Gerda Stocker; 26 August 1912 – 19 November 1997) was a Swiss journalist. She worked for radio and the press from the early 1940s and sat on the regional and national program commissions for radio and television. From 1940 to 1971 she was active in the women's suffrage movement, among other things as head of its permanent press service, and from the 1950s she campaigned for consumer protection.

== Biography ==
Gerda Meyer was born on 26 August 1912 in Spiez, the daughter of Reinhard Meyer, an engineer, and Betty née Rein. She attended the commercial secondary school (Wirtschaftsmittelschule) in Bern and trained in journalism at the University of Bern. She married Arnold Stocker, a painter.

From the early 1940s Stocker-Meyer worked as a journalist for radio and the press. In 1950 she was elected to the board of the Bern radio cooperative (Radiogenossenschaft Bern); she sat on the regional program commission for radio and television and, from 1963, also on the national one.

During World War II Stocker-Meyer dealt with refugee questions, and in 1947–1948 she led the press campaign of the Central Office for Refugee Aid (Zentralstelle für Flüchtlingshilfe). From the 1950s she campaigned for consumer protection. From 1940 to 1971 she was active in the women's suffrage movement, among other things as head of its permanent press service. In the 1980s she campaigned for the equal rights article (Gleichstellungsartikel) and the new marriage law. In 1973 she received the Ida Somazzi Prize. She died on 19 November 1997 in Toffen.

== Archives ==
- Gosteli Foundation, Worblaufen, biographical collection
- Swiss Economic Archives (Schweizerisches Wirtschaftsarchiv), Basel, documentation collection
