= Camille Vidart =

Swiss educator and women's rights activist

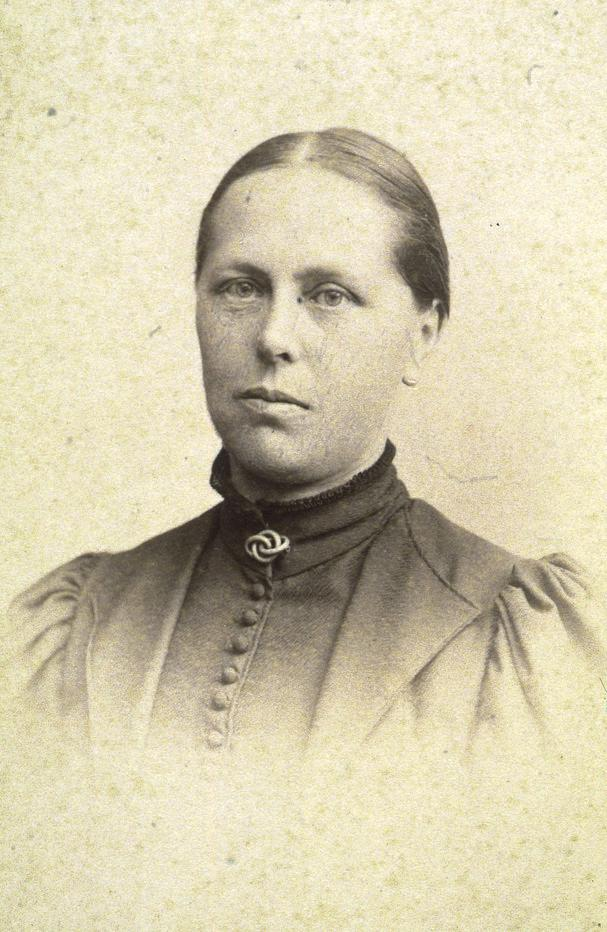
Vidart, c. 1890

Camille Vidart (1854–1930) was a Swiss educator, translator, women's rights activist and pacifist. An accomplished speaker, she was active in many women's associations, including the International Abolitionist Federation, Association internationale des femmes, International Council of Women, International Alliance of Women and Women's International League for Peace and Freedom. As a translator, Vidart translated Johanna Spyri's Heidi from German into French. She devoted considerable efforts to fighting for women's suffrage in Switzerland but was unable to achieve success.

== Early life ==
Born on 14 February 1854 in Divonne-les-Bains, a French town to the north of Geneva, Camille Vidart was the elder daughter of the physician Alphonse Vidart and his Swiss wife Jeanne-Louise née Vaucher. After the early death of her mother, Vidart was raised by an aunt in Geneva. In 1874, she graduated in French at the University of Lyon.

== Career ==
On graduating, she taught at the École Peschier girls' school in Geneva from 1874. In 1879, apparently because the examiners thought from her first name that she was a man, she was admitted to the entrance competition for the girls' high school (Höhere Töchterschule) in Zürich. She did so well that she became the first woman to be employed there as a teacher. She taught in Zürich until 1884. While there, she befriended Johanna Spyri, the author of Heidi which became a bestseller. Vidart translated the book into French for her shortly after it had been published in German. She completed her career as a teacher at the École Vinet in Lausanne (1884–1886), moving there to care for an aunt in poor health.

90s, Vidart began to take a serious interest in women's rights. In the mid-1880s, she visited the United States with the feminist Harriet Clisby who subsequently supported women's rights in Geneva. Cpreparing for the Congrès des intérêts féminins which formed part of the 1896 Swiss National Exhibition in Geneva. In an opening address, she called for women's solidarity and became associated with the resulting Commission permanente des intérêts féminins (Standing Committee for Women's Issues) which she chaired for a period.

In 1891, she joined the Union des femmes de Genève (Geneva Women's Union), chairing the organization from 1898 to 1902. In June 1899, she attended the International Congress of Women in London, serving as the organization's secretary for the next five years.

After spending several years working with the French-Swiss and German-Swiss women's organizations, in 1899 she founded the Alliance nationale de sociétés féminines suisses (Alliance of Swiss Women's Associations) where she served on the board until 1908. Keen to support women's suffrage, the same year she became secretary of the International Alliance of Women and was an early member of the International Woman Suffrage Alliance. In 1907, together with Auguste de Morsier, she founded the Association genevoise pour le suffrage féminin (Geneva Association for Women's Suffrage) and in 1909 went on to establish the Swiss Association for Women's Suffrage.

With the advent of World War I, Vidart became an active supporter of pacifism. In February 1915 in Geneva, together with Clara Guthrie d'Arcis and others, she helped to found the World Union for International Concord. She became a member of the Women's International League for Peace and Freedom, also established in Geneva in 1915.

Camille Vidart died in Geneva on 29 June 1930.
