= Beate Schnitter =

Swiss architect (1929–2023)

- Born: 20 August 1929; Zurich, Switzerland
- Died: 25 January 2023 (aged 93); Küsnacht, Zurich, Switzerland
- Education: ETH Zurich (diploma in architecture, 1953)
- Occupation: Architect
- Relatives: Lux Guyer (aunt)

Beate Schnitter (20 August 1929 – 25 January 2023) was a Swiss architect from Zurich. She was the niece of architect Lux Guyer and took over Guyer's architectural office in 1955.

== Early life and education ==
Beate Schnitter was born on 20 August 1929 in Zurich to Erwin Schnitter, an engineer, and Rosie Guyer, a teacher and writer. She was the niece of architect Lux Guyer. Schnitter was Protestant and remained unmarried throughout her life. She obtained her diploma in architecture from the Swiss Federal Institute of Technology (ETH Zurich) in Zurich in 1953.

== Career ==
After graduation, Schnitter worked in Amsterdam, Paris, and Zurich. In 1955, she took over Lux Guyer's architectural office in Zurich. She participated in the Swiss National Exhibition (Saffa) of 1958, working in association on the rue des échoppes, la Ligne, and the press pavilion.

Her notable projects included the Eiwog housing development in Stäfa (1973–1978), numerous villas and vacation homes, and several important restorations of historic buildings. Among her restoration work was the reconstruction of Gottfried Semper's Federal Observatory (1864) to its original state, completed between 1988 and 1997.

== Professional involvement ==
Schnitter was a co-founder of the Zurich working group on urban planning in 1958. She served as an architectural advisor for Heimatschutz and for the Inventory of Swiss Heritage Sites (ISOS), working in the field of historic preservation. She was a member of the Swiss Society of Engineers and Architects (SIA), the Federation of Swiss Architects, and served on the committee of Swiss Heimatschutz.

== Death ==
Schnitter died on 25 January 2023 in Küsnacht, Canton of Zurich.
