= Usama Al Shahmani =

Iraqi-Swiss writer and translator

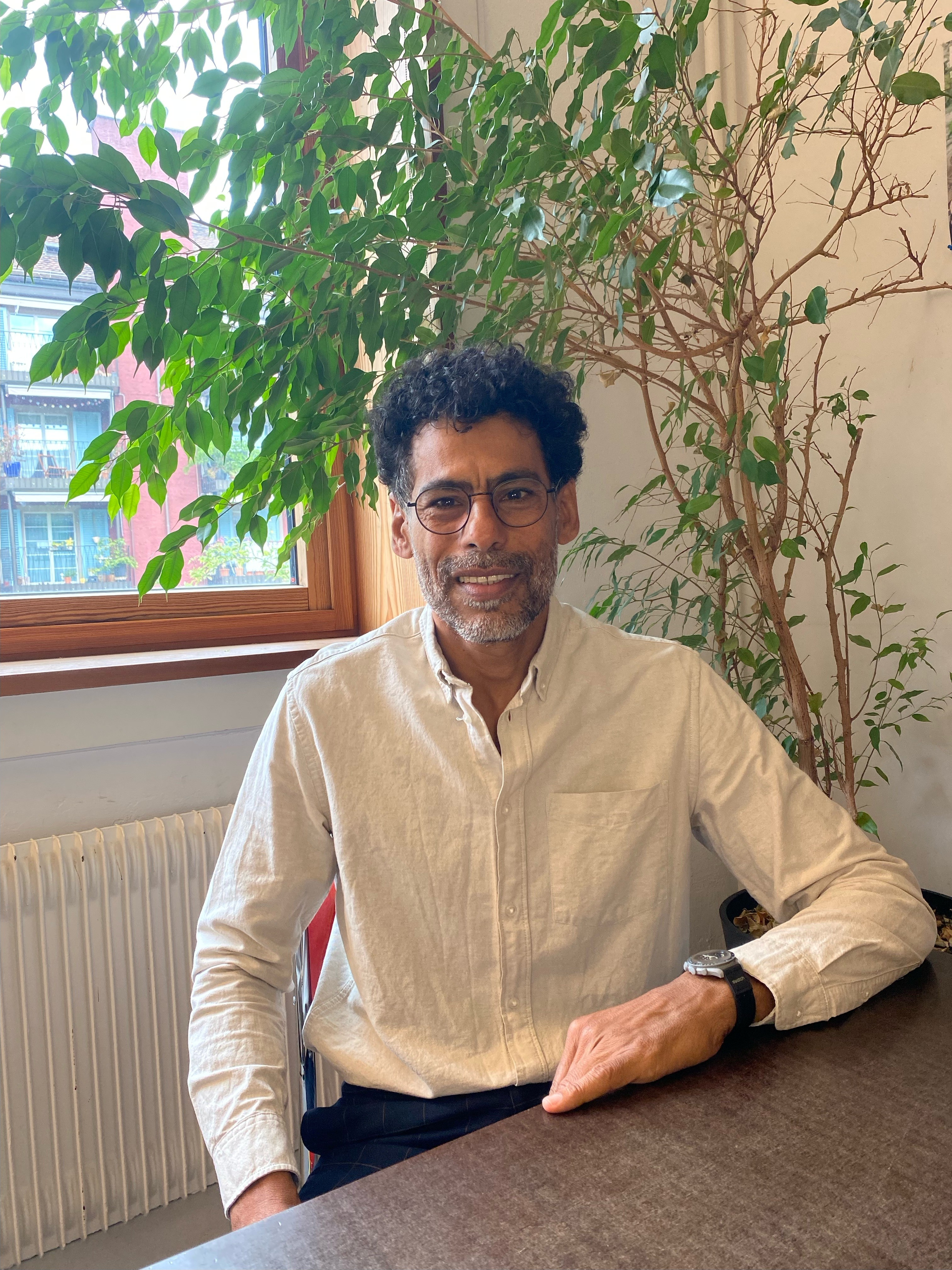
Al Shahmani in 2025

Usama Al Shahmani (born 1971 in Baghdad) in an Iraqi-Swiss writer and translator.

== Biography ==
Al Shahmani grew up in Nasiriyah, Iraq. He studied Arabic language and literature at the University of Baghdad before completing a doctorate. His thesis focused on the contemporary poet Mahmud al-Buraykan.

While still completing his doctorate, Al Shahmani wrote a play in 2002 which was performed on the university stage in Basra. It was banned after the third performance, and all those involved were subsequently persecuted by Saddam Hussein's regime. Al Shahmani managed to flee to Switzerland, where he lived in refugee housing for two years and taught himself German.

He translates German texts into Arabic, including Fräulein Stark by Thomas Hürlimann, Der Islam by Peter Heine, and Über die Religion by Friedrich Schleiermacher.

His first novel, In der Fremde sprechen die Bäume arabisch, was published in 2018 by Limmat Verlag in Zurich and was nominated for the «Lieblingsbuch des Deutschschweizer Buchhandels». The novel is a work of mourning for his younger brother, who went missing in Iraq and whose whereabouts the family has been unable to determine despite tremendous efforts. The novel Im Fallen lernt die Feder fliegen deals with the question of successful or failed integration: here, a family that emigrated to the West returns to their homeland, Iraq. For the daughters, however, Iraq is now a foreign country, which is why they return to Switzerland. In 2022, the novel Der Vogel zweifelt nicht am Ort, zu dem er fliegt was published. To mark the 50th anniversary of Limmat Verlag, Usama Al Shahmani selected fifty of his favorite poems from the publishing program. The resulting anthology was published under the title Ein Seidenfaden zu den Träumen in February 2025.

Since 2021, Usama Al Shahmani has been a literary critic for the «Literaturclub» on Swiss television SRF.

Al Shahmani lives in Zurich.

== Publications in German ==
- Die Fremde – ein seltsamer Lehrmeister: eine Begegnung zwischen Bagdad, Frauenfeld und Berlin. Zürich: Limmat Verlag. 2016.
- In der Fremde sprechen die Bäume arabisch. Zürich: Limmat Verlag. 2018.
  - In Foreign Lands, Trees Speak Arabic. Translated by Rachel Farmer. Norwich: Strangers Press. 2022.
- Im Fallen lernt die Feder fliegen. Zürich: Limmat Verlag. 2020.
- Der Vogel zweifelt nicht am Ort, zu dem er fliegt. Zürich: Limmat Verlag. 2022.
  - Adaptation for the MAXIM Theatre in Zurich, written by Usama Al Shahmani and Ivna Žic. Zurich 2025
- In der Fremde sprechen die Bäume arabisch. Paperback. Zürich: Unionsverlag. 2022.
- Im Fallen lernt die Feder fliegen. Paperback. Zürich: Unionsverlag. 2023.
- Der Vogel zweifelt nicht am Ort, zu dem er fliegt. Paperback. Zürich: Unionsverlag. 2025.
- Ein Seidenfaden zu den Träumen. Gedichte aus der Schweiz, ausgewählt und mit einem Vorwort von Usama Al Shahmani. Zürich: Limmat Verlag. 2025.

== Publications in Italian ==
- In terra straniera gli alberi parlano arabo. Novel. Marcos y Marcos, 2021.
- La piuma cadendo impara a volare. Novel. Marcos y Marcos, 2022.
- Quando migrano, gli ucelli sanno dove andare. Novel. Marcos y Marcos, 2024.
- In fondo al fiume Tigri dorme una canzone. Marcos y Marcos, 2026.

== Publications in French ==
- Les arbres ici parlent aussi l’arabe. Editions La Veilleuse, 2025.

== Publications in Arabic ==
- Über die Gruppe 47. Eine Forschung für die Universität Basra, 1999.
- Der Dichter Mahmud al Buraikan und sein Text. Ein Beitrag zur modernen arabischen Dichtung. Arab Encyclopedia House. Beirut 2004.
- Schreiben im Zeitalter der Postmoderne. Verlag The General House of Cultural Affairs, Bagdad 2014.

== Translations into Arabic ==
- Ivo Zanoni: Der Dichter am Bahnhof: Al-Hadara Publishing, Cairo 2010.
- Jürgen Habermas: Between Secular Reason and Religious Faith. Selected Essays. Institute of Philosophy, Baghdad 2011.
- Peter Heine: Islam. Westöstlicher Diwan Publishing House, Beirut 2012.
- East–West. On the Paths Between East and West. Published by the Basel Historical Museum, 2013.
- Thomas Hürlimann: Miss Stark. The General House of Cultural Affairs, Baghdad 2013.
- Friedrich Daniel Schleiermacher: On Religion. Speeches to the Educated Among Their Contemptors. Al Tanweer, Beirut 2017.

== Contributions ==
- Frauenfelder Lesegesellschaft (Hrsg.): Bleib doch – komm wieder (Thurgauer Lesebuch). Frauenfeld 2021.
- Ulrich Niederer (Hrsg.): Inglin Schneesturm: Schneesturm im Hochsommer. Limmat Verlag, Zürich, 2021.
- Christoph Keller (Hrsg.): Und dann klingelst du bei mir. Geschichten in Leichter Sprache. Limmat Verlag, Zürich 2023.
- Stefan Keller Johannes Stieger (Hrsg.): Die Kaserne wird zivil. Militär und Volk in Frauenfeld. Rotpunktverlag, Zürich 2023.
- Leta Semadeni (Hrsg.): Tamangur. Atlantis, Zürich 2026.

== Awards ==
- 2018 Förderpreis der Stadt Frauenfeld
- 2019 Terra Nova-Literaturpreis der Schweizerischen Schillerstiftung
- 2019 Förderpreis des Kanton Thurgau
- 2019 Nomination «Das Lieblingsbuch des Deutschschweizer Buchhandels»
- 2025 Literarische Auszeichnung Stadt Zürich
- 2026 Anerkennungsbeitrag des Kanton Zürich
- 2026 Werkjahr Stadt Zürich
