= Elisabeth Joris =

Swiss historian (born 1946)

Elisabeth Joris (born 1946) is a Swiss historian. She has written and edited several works on gender history in Switzerland, and was co-editor of feminist magazine Olympe, and co-initiator of the 1991 Swiss women's strike. She was awarded an honorary doctorate by the University of Zurich in 2020.

== Biography ==
Joris was born in 1946 in Visp. She grew up in Visp and has lived in Zürich since 1966. Joris graduated from school at a time when women rarely proceeded to higher education, so she first gained her teaching qualification. She studied history and history of French literature at the University of Zurich and earned a licentiate degree under the direction of Rudolf Braun in 1980. Although she began a doctorate, she found she preferred to study women's history, which at the time was not considered by her professors to be a suitable subject for a doctoral degree. She then worked as an elementary school teacher and a freelance historian. She has taught at the Riesbach Cantonal School in Zurich and at the Lucerne School of Social Work. She retired in 2010.

Joris co-founded the group Kritisches Oberwallis and the critical newspaper Rote Anneliese. She edited several works about women's and gender history in Switzerland. In 1986, she published a pioneering source book about women's history in Switzerland alongside Heidi Witzig. Joris wrote two articles, Women, Gender, Social Movements (Switzerland) and Züblin-Spiller, Else for the International Encyclopedia of the First World War.

In 2010, she submitted the manuscript of her fifth book to the University of Zurich as her dissertation, finally earning a doctorate. Joris was a co-editor of the feminist magazine Olympe. Joris was a co-initiator of the first Swiss women's strike in 1991.

Joris is married and a mother of two.

== Publications (selection) ==
=== As an author ===
- Elisabeth Seiler-Joris, Sozialer Wandel im Oberwallis in der zweiten Hälfte des neunzehnten Jahrhunderts. Zürich: 1979 (licentiate thesis, University of Zurich, 1980).
- with Heidi Witzig: Brave Frauen, aufmüpfige Weiber: Wie sich die Industrialisierung auf Alltag und Lebenszusammenhänge von Frauen auswirkte (1820–1940). Zurich: Chronos, 1992.
- with Adrian Knoepfli: Eine Frau prägt eine Firma: Zur Geschichte von Firma und Familie Feller. Zürich: Chronos, 1996.
- Liberal und eigensinnig: Die Pädagogin Josephine Stadlin – die Homöopathin Emilie Paravicini-Blumer. Handlungsspielräume von Bildungsbürgerinnen im 19. Jahrhundert. Zürich: Chronos, 2010 (dissertation, University of Zurich, 2010).

=== As an editor ===
- with Heidi Witzig: Frauengeschichte(n): Dokumente aus zwei Jahrhunderten zur Situation der Frauen in der Schweiz. Zürich Limmat, 1986.
- with Katrin Rieder and Béatrice Ziegler: Tiefenbohrungen: Frauen und Männer auf den grossen Tunnelbaustellen der Schweiz, 1870–2005. Baden: Hier + jetzt, 2006.
- with Erika Hebeisen, Angela Zimmermann: Zürich 68: Kollektive Aufbrüche ins Ungewisse. Baden: Hier + jetzt, 2008.
- with Renate Wegmüller: „Stimmen, wählen und gewählt zu werden sei hinfort unsere Devise und unser Ziel“. Kurze Geschichte des Frauenstimmrechts in Quellen. Wettingen, eFeF, 2011.
- with Rita Schmid: Damit der Laden läuft. Ein kritischer Blick in die scheinbar vertraute Welt des Detailhandels. Zürich: Rotpunktverlag, 2019.
