= Rosa Neuenschwander =

Swiss feminist

- Born: 3 April 1883; Brienz, Switzerland
- Died: 20 December 1962 (aged 79); Bern, Switzerland
- Occupations: Educator, Activist

Rosa Neuenschwander (1883-1962) was a Swiss feminist who was a pioneer in vocational education and counseling.

== Biography ==
Neuenschwander was born in Brienz, Switzerland, on 3 April 1883. She became the first vocational counselor in Bern. She was instrumental in founding several social projects to benefit women and youths. Neuenschwander organized the first exhibition on women's work in Bern in 1923, which she expanded into the Swiss Exhibition for Women's Work(SAFFA), in 1928.

She founded major women's organizations, including the Schweizerische Frauengewerbeverband and the Schweizerische Landfrauenverband (SLFV), a leading rural women's association that supported the women's suffrage movement.

She died on 20 December 1962 in Bern, Switzerland.

== Works ==
- Literature by and about Rosa Neuenschwander in the German National Library catalogue
