= Marie Boehlen =

Swiss jurist and politician

- Born: 19 October 1911; Riggisberg, Bern, Switzerland
- Died: 30 November 1999 (aged 88); Bern, Switzerland
- Education: University of Bern
- Employer: Federation of Swiss Women's Associations
- Organization(s): Women's Suffrage Association, Action Committee for Women's Collaboration
- Political party: Social Democratic Party of Switzerland

Marie Boehlen (19 October 1911 – 30 November 1999) was a Swiss jurist and politician of the Social Democratic Party of Switzerland.

== Life and career ==
Boehlen was born in 1911 in Riggisberg, Bern, Switzerland.

Boehlen attended the female teacher seminary in Bern and earned her Matura in 1931. She subsequently studied jurisprudence at the University of Bern, where she became a proponent in 1939 and a doctor in 1951. In 1957, she became a youth advocate for the Municipality of Bern and was the youngest youth advocate in Switzerland at that time. As a student, she became interested in women's issues and politics. In 1942, she joined the Women's Suffrage Association and became the chairwoman of the Action Committee for Women's Collaboration in the commune.

Three years later, she joined the Social Democratic Party and chaired the women's section of the party (SP Frauen) from 1966 to 1974. During 15 years from 1949 to 1966, she served as chairwoman of the Legal Commission of the Federation of Swiss Women's Associations. Moreover, she was a member of the UNESCO Swiss Commission from 1957 to 1968.

After women's suffrage was introduced in Switzerland in 1971, Boehlen retired early to engage in politics. She subsequently served as a City Councillor of Bern from 1972 to 1976 and as a Grand Councillor of the city from 1974 to 1986. At the age of 74 in 1985, she was awarded the Ida-Somazzi-Preis for her lifetime commitment on women's issues. In her award acceptance speech, she stated that her commitment to gender equality has not always been popular, and that she has suffered more defeats than successes, but has contributed to a large extent to a great social change.

She died in 1999 in Bern.

== Bibliography ==
- Lüscher, Liselotte (2009). Eine Frau macht Politik. Marie Boehlen 1911–1999 (in German). Zurich: Limmat-Verlag. ISBN 978-3-85791-591-8.
