= Clara Guthrie d'Arcis =

American-born Swiss peace activist, feminist and international businesswoman

Clara Guthrie d’Arcis
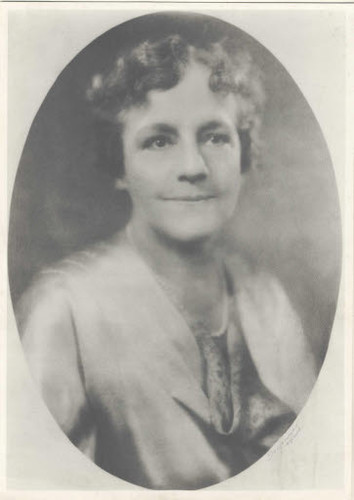
- Born: Clara Guthrie; February 22, 1879; New Orleans, US
- Died: May 12, 1937 (aged 58); Geneva, Switzerland
- Occupation(s): peace activist, feminist
- Known for: founder and president of World Union of Women for International Concord

Clara Guthrie d’Arcis (22 February 1879, New Orleans – 12 May 1937, Geneva) was an American-born Swiss peace activist, feminist and international businesswoman. She was a founder and president of World Union of Women for International Concord and honorary treasurer of the Peace and Disarmament Committee of the Women's International Organizations. She represented Switzerland at the 5th Quinquennial Convention of the International Council of Women. As president of a peace movement, Clara Guthrie d’Arcis has become well known internationally.

== Life ==
Clara Guthrie was born on 22 February 1879 in New Orleans in a family of James Guthrie and Clara Cocke. Her father was a distinguished member of the Louisiana Bar and her grandfather, Judge Edwin T. Merrick, had served as Chief Justice of the Supreme Court of Louisiana. Through her grandmother, Caroline E. Merrick, Guthrie early came in contact with the women's movement in the United States. In 1902, Guthrie owned and managed a small factory in Mississippi.

Her first husband was Philip Cocke with whom she had a daughter, Elizabeth. In 1911 Guthrie married for the second time to Swiss businessman Ludovic d’Arcis. She then moved to Geneva and joined her husband in running a successful import business for American automobiles and other consumer goods. Among other business activities they distributed General Motors cars in Switzerland. Clara Guthrie d’Arcis died on 12 May 1937 in Geneva.

== Activity ==
In 1915 d’Arcis together with 36 other women from various countries founded World Union of Women for International Concord in Geneva. The goal of the organization was to work on international concord and become a movement of women from all the countries for moral education based on individual discipline and commitment. d’Arcis remained the president of World Union of Women for International Concord until her death.

During World War I, d’Arcis was active in furthering industrial and economic relations between Switzerland and France and between Switzerland and the United States. She also led fundraising efforts to provide food for child victims of the war in neutral Switzerland and was one of the founders of the International Union of the Save the Children Fund.

In the interwar period d’Arcis served as a treasurer of the Peace and Disarmament Committee of the Women's International Organizations. She led the committee's fundraising efforts and in 1934 launched fundraising campaign urging American manufactures of consumer goods to recognize that peace time production was more profitable than manufacturing for wars. Peace and Disarmament Committee published a "Peace-Roll of Industry" in which such corporations as General Motors, U.S. Steel, and Shell Union Oil declared peace essential to prosperity.

== Views ==
Clara Guthrie d’Arcis believed that education for peace, led by women, could create a peaceful world order. She asserted that women had a special role to play in peace buildings, having maternal concern for the preservation of human life. Her experience as a peace activist and international businesswoman convinced her that economic causes of war were paramount. She argued that bankers and industrialists who funded wars and produced arms and war materials had to be re-educated to invest in consumer and other peacetime products. D’Arcis believed that moral considerations must influence business decisions and businessmen must promote peace and disarmament.
