= Maria Felchlin =

Swiss physician and feminist (1899–1987)

- Born: 18 June 1899; Olten, Solothurn, Switzerland
- Died: 12 November 1987 (aged 88); Olten, Solothurn, Switzerland
- Occupation: Physician
- Father: Albert Felchlin

Maria Felchlin (18 June 1899 – 12 November 1987) was a Swiss physician and women's rights activist from Olten. She was the first practicing female physician in the canton of Solothurn and a liberal pioneer of women's suffrage, and she presided over the Swiss working group Woman and Democracy. In 1964 she founded the foundation that awards the Ida Somazzi Prize, and much of its financial basis came from her.

== Biography ==
Maria Felchlin was born on 18 June 1899 in Olten, the daughter of Albert Felchlin, a master painter (Malermeister). She remained unmarried. She attended the cantonal school (Kantonsschule) in Aarau, studied medicine in Zurich and Kiel, and obtained a doctorate in medicine.

Felchlin was the first practicing female physician in the canton of Solothurn, working in Olten from 1929. From 1939 to 1945 she was a medical first lieutenant (Sanitätsoberleutnant) in the air-raid protection service (Luftschutz). She was also a successful competitive shooter (Matchschützin).

Felchlin held leading positions in numerous political, cultural and folklore organizations at cantonal and federal level. A liberal (freisinnig) pioneer of women's suffrage, she was president of the Swiss working group Woman and Democracy (Schweizerische Arbeitsgemeinschaft Frau und Demokratie). In 1964 she founded the Dr. Ida Somazzi Foundation for the Advancement of Women (Dr.-Ida-Somazzi-Stiftung für Frauenförderung). The foundation was set up in memory of the women's rights activist Ida Somazzi, and much of its financial basis was donated by Felchlin. Since 1966 it has awarded the Ida Somazzi Prize.

As editor of the Oltner Neujahrsblätter, Felchlin worked as a writer and genealogist. She collected Matzendorf pottery (Matzendorfer Geschirr) from the first half of the 19th century and studied it scientifically. Matzendorf made her an honorary citizen. In 1972 she became the first woman to receive the cultural prize (Kulturpreis) of the canton of Solothurn. She died in Olten on 12 November 1987.

== Works ==
- "Das Arkanum der Matzendorfer Keramiken", in Jahrbuch für Solothurnische Geschichte, 44, 1971, 5–55

== Bibliography ==
- K. H. Flatt, 150 Jahre Solothurner Freisinn, 1981, 62–66
- Oltner Tagblatt, 14 November 1987
- Oltner Neujahrsblätter, 1989
