= Lux Guyer =

Swiss architect

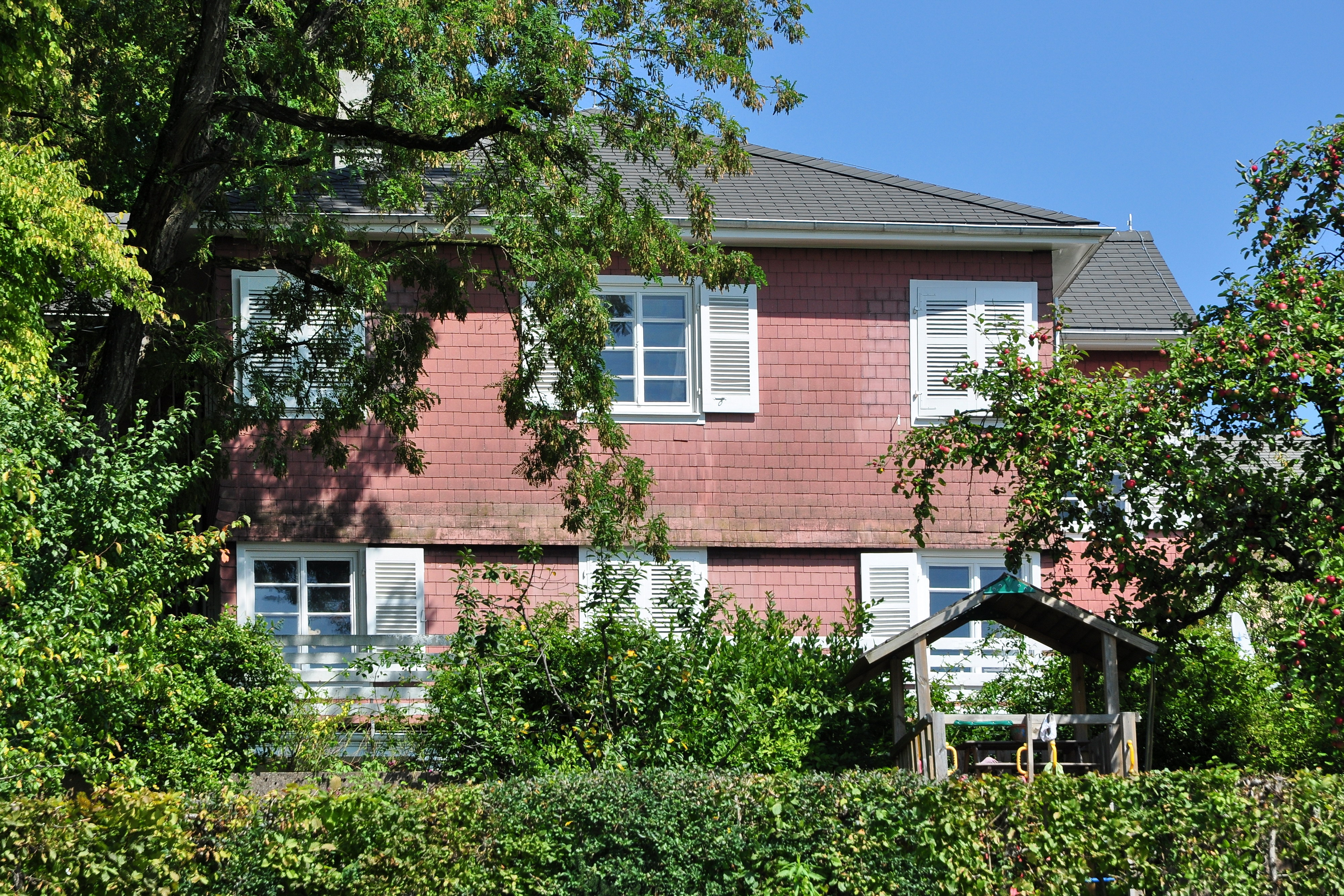
Lux Guyer: Villa in Küsnacht (1933)

Luise (Lux) Guyer (20 August 1894 in Zurich – 25 May 1955 in Zurich) was a Swiss architect, remembered above all for designing buildings for the SAFFA women's fair, Bern, in 1927.

== Early life ==
The daughter of Johannes Heinrich Guyer, a schoolteacher, she first took interior design courses with Wilhelm Kienzle at the Arts and Crafts School in Zurch (1917) before attending the Technology Institute (1918). After serving apprenticeships with architectural firms in Zurich and Berlin, she embarked on study trips to Paris, London and Florence.

== Career ==
In 1924, Guyer became one of the first women in Switzerland to establish her own architectural practice, opening an office in Zurich. Her projects often also covered interiors on which she collaborated with designers. One of her early commissions was a housing project with apartments for single women. In 1927, she was head architect for the first SAAFA fair exhibiting the accomplishments of women. She completed one of the buildings in only three months using prefabricated elements made of wood. When the fair opened the following year in Bern, her reputation was firmly established. Despite years of war and economic hardship, Guyer continued to run her business under her own name, experiencing an upturn in the 1950s.

Lux Guyer married Hans Studer in 1930 and had a son, Urs, in 1933. She preferred to do her design work at night; in the early morning she worked in the garden and spent her days on building sites, at meetings or in the office. At weekends, she received visitors.

Her architectural office was later taken over by her niece, Beate Schnitter.

== Selected works ==
Lux Guyer's completed projects include:

- Lettenhof women's housing development, Zurich (1927)
- Holiday home, Weggis (1928)
- Lindenhof home for female students, teachers and office workers, Zurich (1928)
- Head architect for the SAFFA women's fair, Bern (1928)
- A medium-sized family home, SAFFA show house, Bern (1928)
- Villa Kusentobel, Küsnacht (1933)
- Old people's home, Jongny-sur-Vevey (1942)

In 1997 Lux Guyers's work was honoured by the Gesellschaft zu Fraumünster.
