= Else Züblin-Spiller =

Swiss journalist and temperance activist (1881–1948)

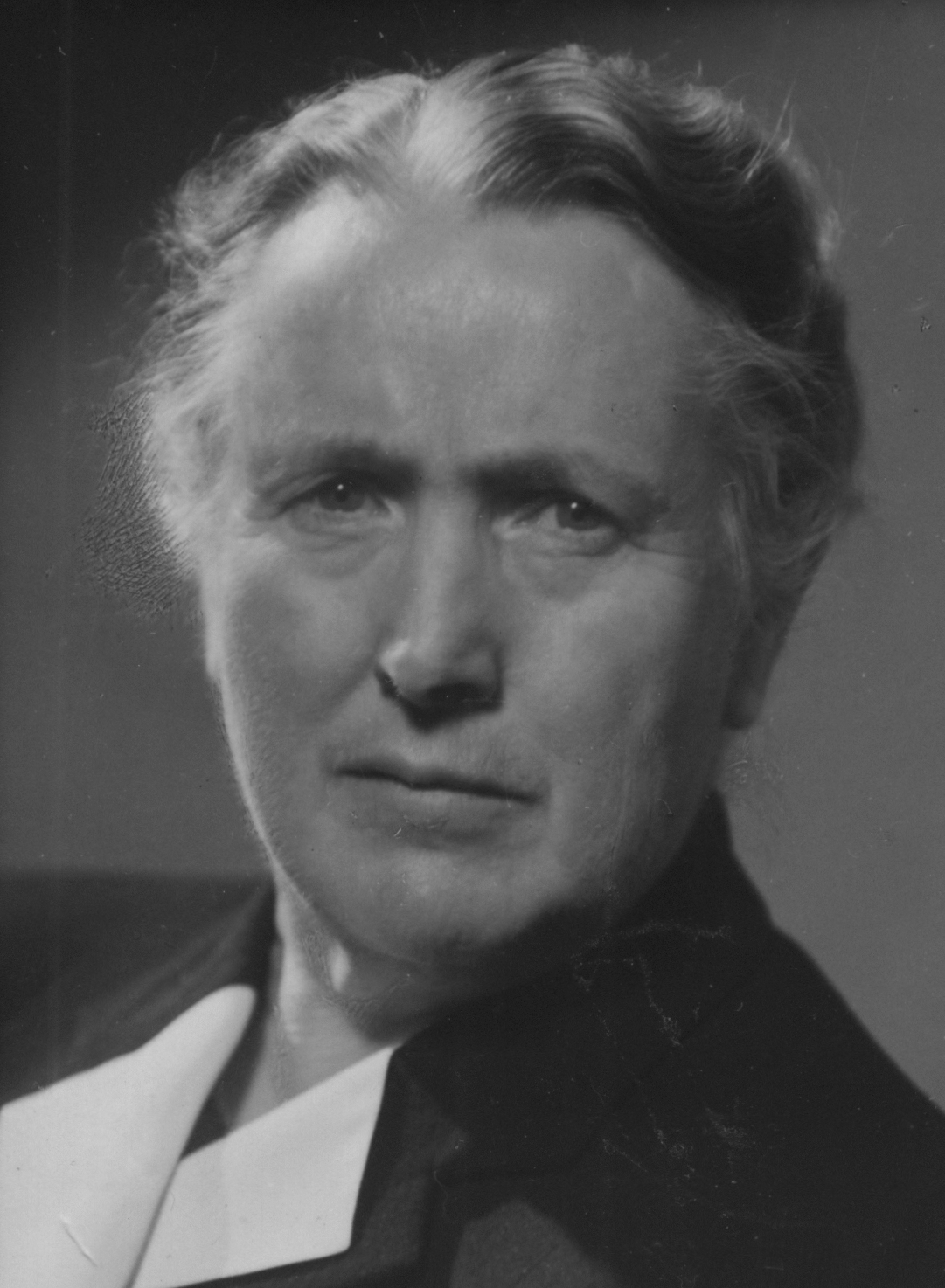
- Else Züblin-Spiller
- Born: 1 November 1881; Seen
- Died: 11 April 1948 (aged 66); Kilchberg
- Occupations: Journalist and organiser

Else Züblin-Spiller or Else Zueblin-Spiller (1 November 1881 – 11 April 1948) was a Swiss journalist and temperance activist. She organised for soldier's welfare in 700 different locations.

== Life ==
Züblin-Spiller was born in Seen in 1881. Her father was Johann Jakob Spiller. Her family moved to a small house in Wallisellen and she was at first trained in textiles. She moved into journalism in 1904 when she began writing newspaper articles for the Jean Frey Verlag printing press. By 1911 she has rose to be editor-in-chief of the newspaper Die Schweizerischen Wochenzeitung.

She is known in starting an organisation, Schweizer Verband Soldatenwohl, in 1914 to provide alcohol free food and drink for soldiers involved in the first world war. The first opened on November 22, 1914, and by the end of the war there was 700 similar establishments.

In 1916 she partnered with the Federal Department of Military Affairs and the Swiss Red Cross to create a soldier's welfare service. The following year they started to employ sick soldiers which increased the benefit of their work. She worked with The Salvation Army and gave talks about the need for action rather than pity.

In 1918 she was involved with creating hospitals that were needed for the flu pandemic that was circulating in western Europe. In 1919 she was invited to America where she met her husband Ernst Züblin and they married in 1920. The organisation for soldiers was transformed into a catering organisation for factories and became very successful.

== Death and legacy ==
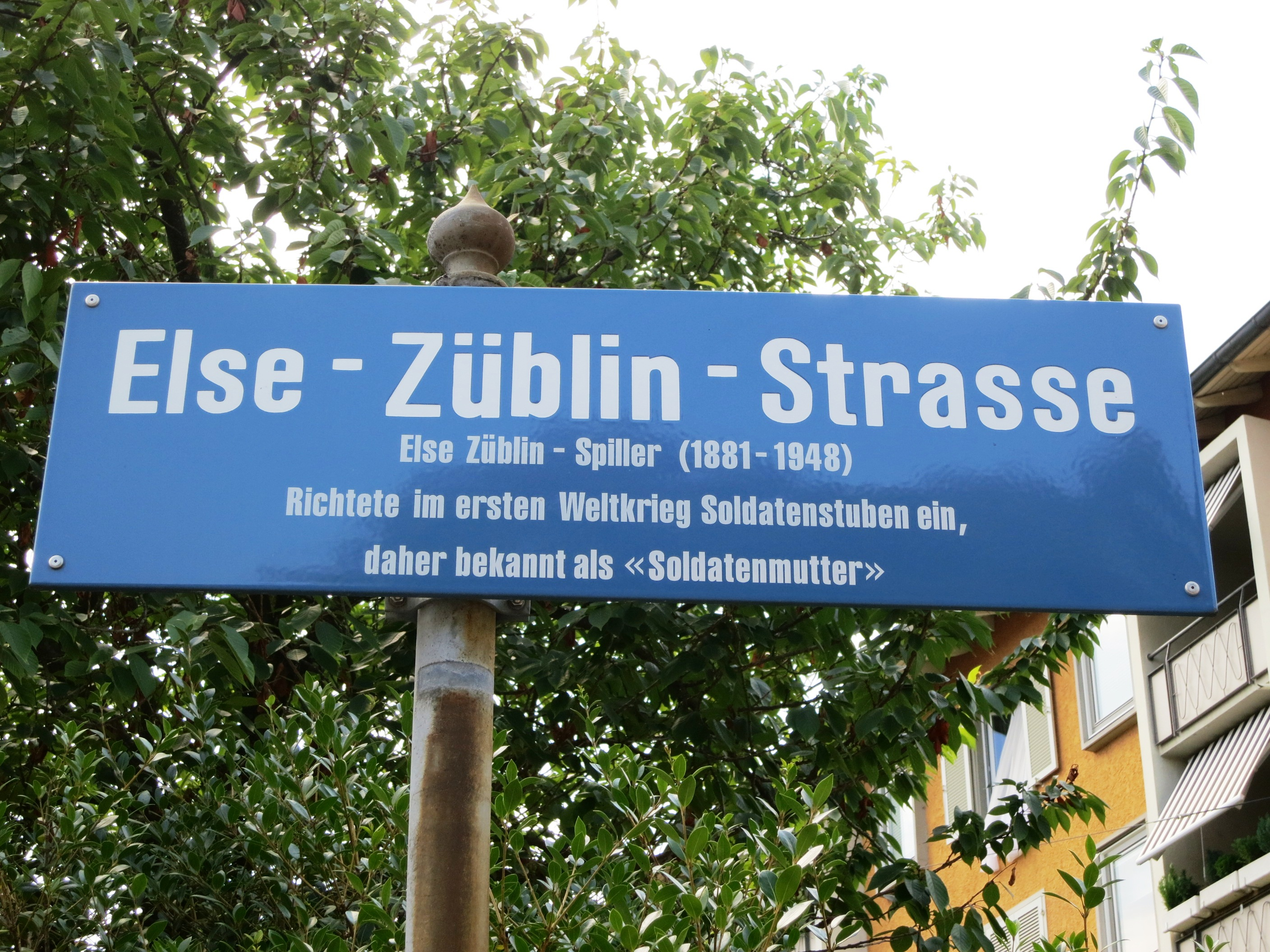
A street in Zurich

Züblin-Spiller died in Kilchberg in 1948. There is a street in Zurich named after her, and a commemorative plaque.
