= Hermann Böschenstein (journalist) =

Swiss journalist (1905–1997)

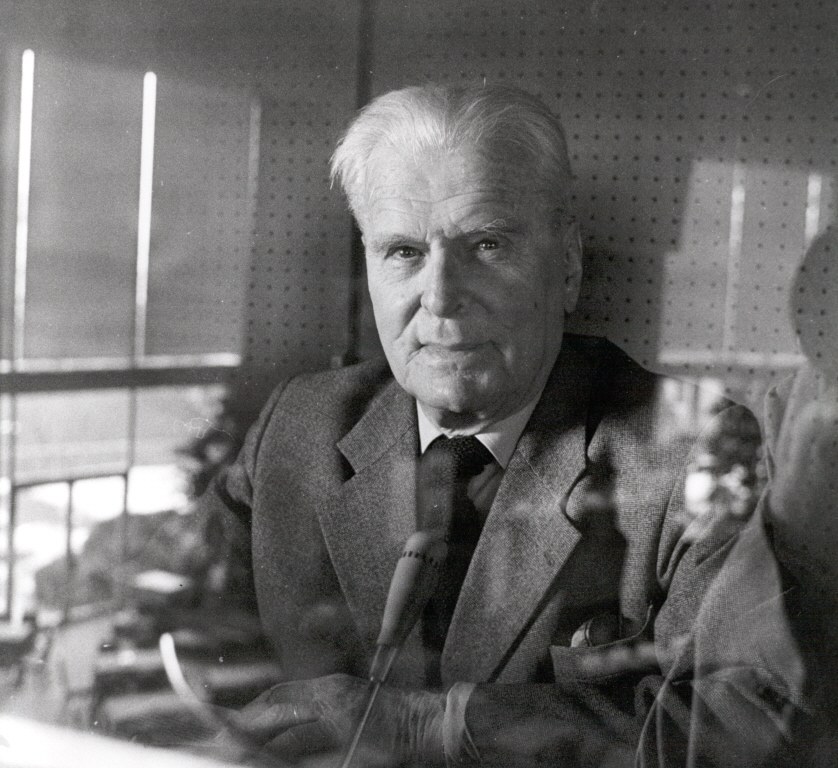
- Böschenstein in 1984
- Born: 29 May 1905; Bern, Switzerland
- Died: 23 September 1997 (aged 92); Bern, Switzerland
- Occupation: Journalist
- Spouse: Esther Schenk (m. 1930)
- Parents: Karl Böschenstein (father); Mathilde Mürset (mother)
- Awards: Ida Somazzi Prize (1979)

Hermann Böschenstein (29 May 1905 – 23 September 1997) was a Swiss journalist. From 1925 to 1974 he worked as a parliamentary reporter, editor and correspondent for Swiss newspapers; as the Berlin correspondent of the Basler Nachrichten he was expelled by the Nazis. He wrote numerous biographies of members of the Federal Council.

== Biography ==
Hermann Böschenstein was born on 29 May 1905 in Bern, the son of Karl Böschenstein and Mathilde Mürset. In 1930 he married Esther Schenk, a great-granddaughter of Carl Schenk. He attended the Literargymnasium (humanities secondary school) in Bern and studied law in Bern and Paris, and in 1929 he qualified as an advocate (Fürsprecher) in the canton of Bern.

From 1925 to 1930 Böschenstein reported on parliament for the Neue Berner Zeitung. He was an editor at the Schweizer Mittelpresse from 1930 to 1933 and at the Schweizer Freie Presse from 1933 to 1935. From 1935 to 1937 he was the Berlin correspondent of the Basler Nachrichten and was expelled by the Nazis. From 1939 to 1950 he was the federal politics editor (Bundeshausredaktor) of the National-Zeitung, and from 1951 to 1953 he held the same post at Die Weltwoche. In 1953 and 1954 he worked in London for the Ringier publications, and from 1955 to 1974 he worked in Bern as an editor of and contributor to various newspapers, among them Der Bund and the Neue Zürcher Zeitung.

Böschenstein had an in-depth knowledge of federal politics and contemporary history, and as a journalist he was a precise chronicler. He wrote numerous biographies of members of the Federal Council, and in 1972 the University of Bern awarded him an honorary doctorate. In 1979 he received the Ida Somazzi Prize. He died in Bern on 23 September 1997.

== Works ==
- Bedrohte Heimat, 2nd edition, 1965
- Vor unsern Augen, 1978
- Eduard Will, 1981
- Zwischen Diplomatie und Gesellschaft, 1992

== Bibliography ==
- Bieler Tagblatt, 29 May 1995
- Der Bund, 30 September 1997

=== Archives ===
- Archiv für Zeitgeschichte, ETH Zurich: papers (Nachlass)
