= Klara Honegger =

Swiss suffragist and pacifist activist (1860–1940)

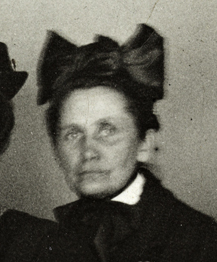
- Born: 29 May 1860; Zurich, Switzerland
- Died: 11 April 1940 (aged 79); Zurich, Switzerland
- Occupations: suffragist and pacifist activist
- Organization(s): Union for Women's Efforts Zurich, Swiss Association for Women's Suffrage, Swiss Central Office for Peace Work, Women's Alliance for the Promotion of International Harmony

Klara Honegger (29 May 1860 – 11 April 1940) was a Swiss suffragist and pacifist activist. She was co-founder of the Union für Frauenbestrebungen Zürich and a founding member of the Schweizerischen Verbandes für Frauenstimmrecht. She was the leader of the Swiss Central Office for Peace Work and a member of Women's Alliance for the Promotion of International Harmony.

== Early life ==
Honegger was born Zurich, Switzerland in 1860.

== Activism ==
In 1896, Honegger was a co-founder of the Union für Frauenbestrebungen Zürich (Union for Women's Efforts Zurich), and served as president from 1903 to 1911.

As a campaigner for women's suffrage, Honegger gave speeches in urban and rural areas of Switzerland. In 1909, Honegger was a founding member of the Schweizerischen Verbandes für Frauenstimmrecht (Swiss Association for Women's Suffrage). That year she was also a delegate to the International Woman Suffrage Alliance in London, and in Stockholm 1911, both with Carrie Chapman Catt presiding.

Honegger joined the peace movement in 1915. She was the leader of the Swiss Central Office for Peace Work and a member of Women's Alliance for the Promotion of International Harmony. From 1933, she worked in the Women and Democracy Working Group.

== Death ==
She died in 1940 in Zurich, Switzerland, aged 79.
