= Heidi Witzig =

Swiss historian

Heidi Witzig (born 1944), formerly known as Heidi Schäppi-Witzig and now as Heidi Witzig Vetterli, is a Swiss historian with a focus on women's history. She published pioneering works on women's history, and is a co-initiator of the Grandmother's Revolution. In 2021 she was awarded an honorary doctorate by the University of Lausanne.

== Biography ==
Witzig was born in 1944 in Zürich. She is the daughter of an office furniture manufacturer. She grew up in Frauenfeld in the canton of Thurgau. She studied history and art history at the universities of Zurich and Florence and earned a doctorate in Zürich with a work about the early Italian Renaissance in 1978. She subsequently worked as a documentalist at Schweizer Fernsehen DSR. She has been a freelance historian since 1986, with a focus on Alltagsgeschichte and women's history. Her works were "motivated for a long time by the anger against the unequal treatment of women". Witzig co-wrote a pioneering source book about women's history in Switzerland alongside historian Elisabeth Joris, which was published in 1986. Witzig's 2000 book Polenta and Paradeplatz: Regional Everyday Life on the Way to Modern Switzerland 1880-1914 was also considered pioneering. Witzig was awarded an honorary doctorate by the University of Lausanne in 2021.

Around 1982, she became a Socialist municipality councillor in Uster, canton of Zürich.

As a co-initiator of the GrossmütterRevolution ("Grandmothers' Revolution"), she engages in favour of "women in retiring age for a maturity in dignity and social protection for all".

Heidi Witzig is a widowed mother of a daughter.

== Publications (selection) ==
As an author

- Heidi Schäppi-Witzig: Die Florentiner Bürger und ihre Stadt: Eine kulturgeschichtliche Analyse des 15. Jahrhunderts. Zürich: Reihe W, 1978 (dissertation).
- with Elisabeth Joris: Brave Frauen – aufmüpfige Weiber: Wie sich die Industrialisierung auf Alltag und Lebenszusammenhänge von Frauen auswirkte (1820–1940). Zürich: Chronos, 1992; 3rd edition in 2001.
- Polenta und Paradeplatz: Regionales Alltagsleben auf dem Weg zur modernen Schweiz 1880–1914. Zürich: Chronos, 2000; 2nd edition in 2001.
- Wie kluge Frauen alt werden: Was sie tun und was sie lassen. Mit Porträts von Sabine Bobst. Xanthippe, Zürich 2007; 3rd edition in 2008; pocket book edition in 2012.

As an editor

- with Elisabeth Joris: Frauengeschichte(n): Dokumente aus zwei Jahrhunderten zur Situation der Frauen in der Schweiz. Zürich: Limmat, 1986; 4th edition in 2001.
- with Felix Müller and Kathrin Arioli: Unruhige Verhältnisse: Frauen und Männer im Zeitalter der Gleichberechtigung. 15 Porträts aus dem Kanton Zürich. Zürich: Limmat, 2002.
