= Swiss Exhibition for Women's Work =

The Schweizerische Ausstellung für Frauenarbeit (SAFFA), lit. 'Swiss Exhibition for Women's Work', was an exhibition that took place in Bern in 1928 and in Zurich in 1958. SAFFA was organized by the Bund Schweizerischer Frauenvereine (BFS, the Federation of Swiss Women's Associations), the Swiss Catholic Women's League (SKF), and 28 other Swiss women's associations, to highlight the precarious situation of working women in the postwar years.

== Saffa 1928 ==
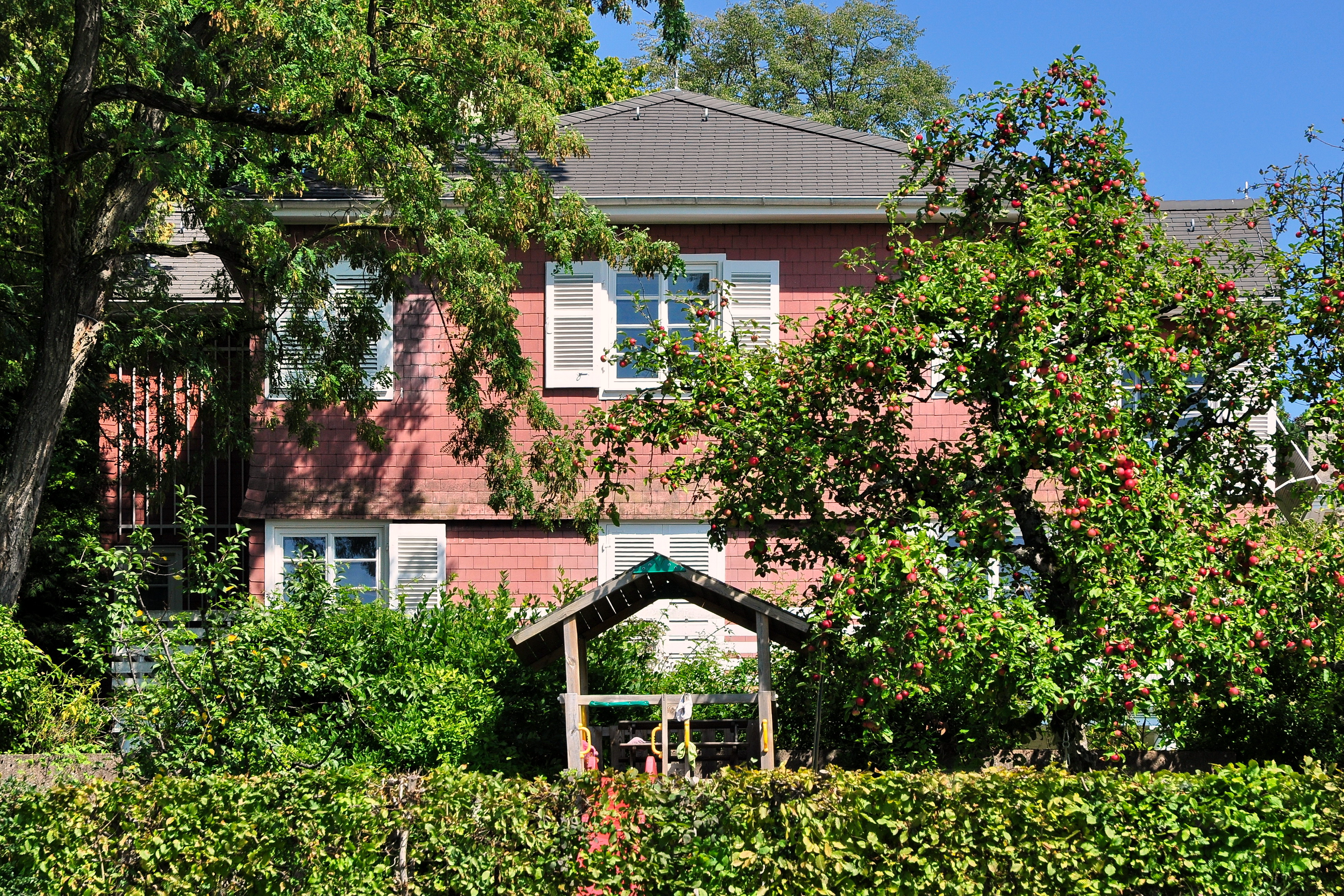
Lux Guyer's SAFFAhaus, as of today in Küsnacht

The predecessor of Saffa was the first exhibition on women's work, organized by Rosa Neuenschwander in Bern in 1923.

In the '"Viererfeld" area (today Länggasse-Felsenau) in Bern, the first Saffa was held from 26 August until 30 September 1928. Louise (Lux) Guyer, the first Swiss women architect, was the chief organizator, and she completed the buildings in only three months using prefabricated elements made of wood. When the fair opened, her reputation was firmly established. Focus of the exhibition were the services of women in family, working life, science and art; the representation of women's work and their importance for the Swiss economy and society. Saffa also promoted the female self-confidence and campaigned –for the so far not related – political rights to the Swiss women and the right to a gainful employment, as well as for their recognition as Swiss citizens with all political rights, until the Women's suffrage in Switzerland was realized in the last cantons in 1990.

== Saffa 1958 ==
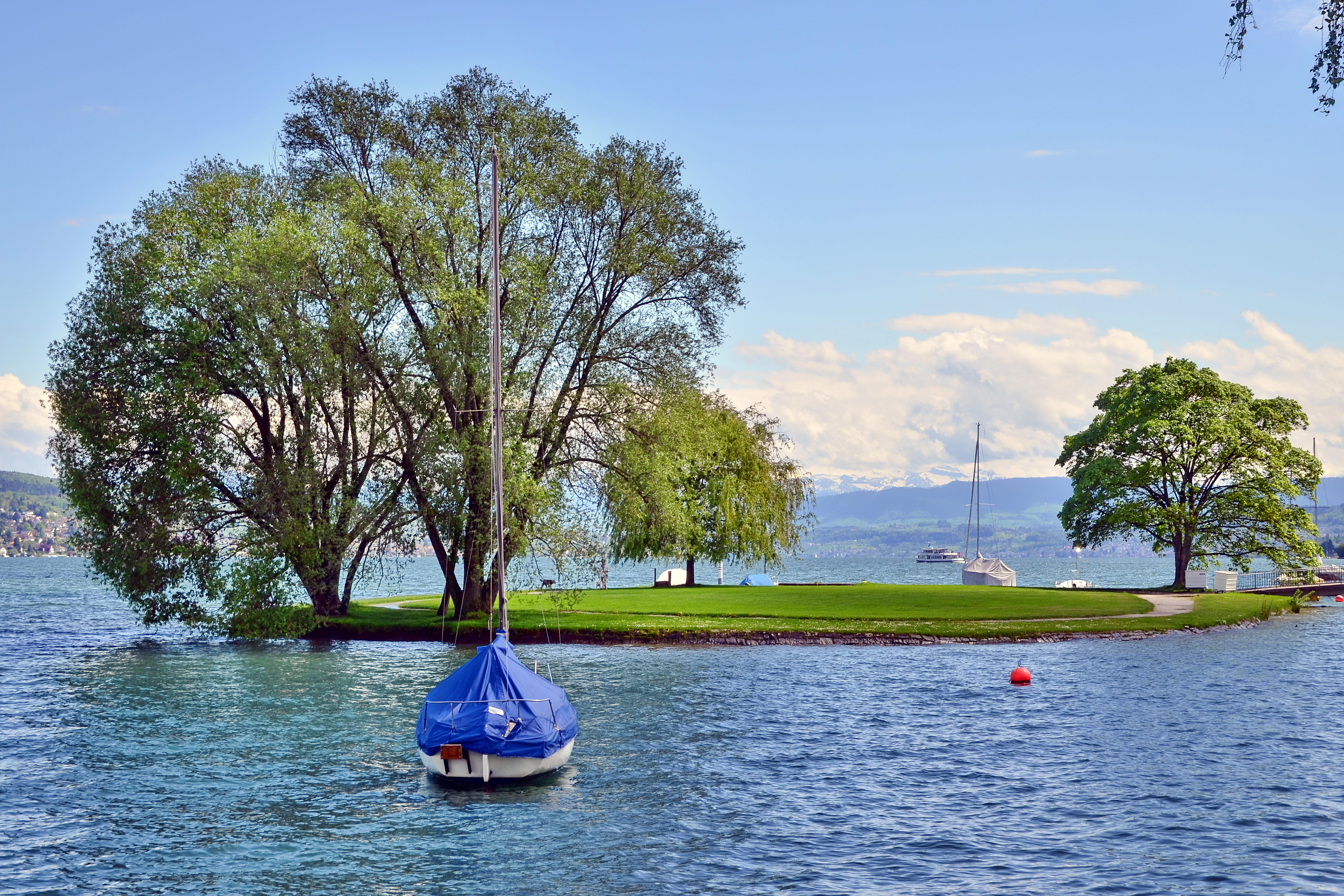
Saffa-Insel on Zürichsee lakeshore in Wollishofen

From 17 July until 15 September 1958, the BSF led the second Saffa in Zürich, with over a hundred national and cantonal women's organisations on the Landiwiese in Zürich-Wollishofen. The Saffa-Insel, an artificial island, was created before the event, being still today a popular meeting place also used as lido in the summer and for events.

Annemarie Hubacher-Constam was chief architect of the exhibition, which stood under the motto "Life circle of women in family, occupation, and country". SAFFA presented women, who were wanted in the booming economy merely as consumers and workers, with possibilities in the areas of education, employment, shopping and leisure. In accordance with the economic and sociopolitical needs, SAFFA promoted the then radical three-phase model as an 'ideal female curriculum': employment prior to the marriage, motherhood, and return to the labour market. In addition, the women had to absorb negative impacts of the rapidly changing world, nevertheless, by spreading harmony inside and outside of their families. The men should be made aware of 'women services' in the service of the general public on the indispensability and so motivated to fix the social discrimination against women. With the profits from the two exhibitions, solidarity works were established for women.

The exhibition was organized and designed exclusively by women, including ETH Zurich alumnae Berta Rahm and Claire Rufer-Eckmann. An innovation and particularly startling were the rotundas, which were planned as manifestation of the solidarity of women. Topics such as "my home – my world", "needle and thread" and "in the realm of the kitchen" attracted the then housewives. The Saffa 1958 was marked by the upcoming vote to women's suffrage, thus the promoters did not practice an overly combative appearance and even created a "men paradise" (Männerparadies) department. On occasion of the Saffatheater Jörg Schneider played in the cabaret comedy Lysistrata.

For that time, the women excelled with innovative ideas, among the Saffa Women's Orchestra at the opening concert, of course, exclusively from women musicians, and directed by the first women conductor who graduated in Switzerland, Hedi Salquin, who conducted the concerto for orchestra Intrada by Fernande Peyrot (1888–1978) in the Wasserkirche auditorium.

The exhibition was a great success, with 1.9 million visitors, and generated a substantial financial surplus that was used for solidarity associations for women. The Saffa island was dedicated to women, and is part of the water lot owned by the canton of Zürich.

== Saffa 2020 ==
The Swiss Federal Council signed the optional protocol as an addition to the Women Convention for the legal and formal recognition of the full human rights of women in Switzerland in February 2007. The Internet platform frauennet.ch proposed the decision to organise a third SAFFA on the occasion of their women picnic brunches on the Swiss national holiday on the Saffa-Island in Zürich. For financial reasons, the project could not be started for the time being. Alliance F, as before better known as Bund Schweizerischer Frauenvereine (BFS), prepares a third Saffa, founded the "2020" association for this purpose, and initiated the project "2020 – der weibliche blick auf die zukunft" (literally: 2020 – the female looks to the future). The project seeks to capture ideas and visions for the future of our society from the perspective of women and in an appropriate manner of the public present. A first web presentation was 2013 and started the realization phase to SAFFA 2020.

The project 2020 – der weibliche blick auf die zukunft is under the patronage of the three federal councillors (Bundesrat) Doris Leuthard, Simonetta Sommaruga and Eveline Widmer-Schlumpf as well as by the former councillor (aBR) Micheline Calmy-Rey.

== See also ==
- Bund Schweizerischer Frauenvereine (BFS)
- Women's suffrage in Switzerland

== Literature ==
- Sibylle Brändli: Der Supermarkt im Kopf: Konsumkultur und Wohlstand in der Schweiz nach 1945. Böhlau Verlag, Wien 2000, ISBN 9783205992646.
- Marie-Louise Barben, Elisabeth Ryter: Verflixt und zugenähnt. Frauenberufsbildung - Frauenerwerbsarbeit 1888 - 1988. Bern 1988, ISBN 9783905278330.
- M. Beyeler: La SAFFA (Schweiz. Ausstellung für Frauenarbeit) de 1958 à Zurich: son architecture et ses architectes. Dissertation, Lausanne 1999.
- Dorothee Huber: Die Tugend der Not. Zu den beiden historischen Ausstellungen für Frauenarbeit (SAFFA 1928 und 1958). In: Ausstellungen - Darstellungen, Beiträge zum Diplomwahlfach "Frauen in der Geschichte des Bauens", Vol. 3, Petra Stojanik (pbl), Lehrstuhl Flora Ruchat-Roncati ETHZ, Zürich 1995.
