= Marthe Gosteli =

- Marthe Gosteli, 1970
- Born: 22 December 1917; Worblaufen, Switzerland
- Died: 7 April 2017 (aged 99); Muri bei Bern, Switzerland
- Occupations: archivist and suffrage activist
- Years active: 1940–2014
- Known for: creating the Swiss women's history archive

Marthe Gosteli (22 December 1917 – 7 April 2017) was a Swiss suffrage activist and archivist. For thirty years, she led the fight for women's right to vote in Switzerland and then focused her attention on preserving the history of Swiss women. Creating an archive of women's biographies and history, Gosteli's work was recognized by many honours and awards, including the 2011 Swiss Human Rights Award.

== Biography ==
Marthe Gosteli was born on 22 December 1917 in Worblaufen, (now known as Ittigen) Switzerland to Johanna Ida (née Salzmann) and Ernst Gosteli. She completed commercial training and took language courses in the French-speaking part of Switzerland and in London. Gosteli's father died, leaving his wife in charge of the estate. With the help of her daughters, the women managed to hold on to and maintain the family farm, but Gosteli recognized how inequality affected them and joined the feminist movement in 1940.

During World War II Gosteli worked for the Wartime Broadcasting Service of the army staff. After the war between 1949 and 1953 and again from 1955 to 1962, she headed the film department of the Information Service at the US Embassy in Bern. In the mid-1960s she turned her full focus toward the woman's movement. Gosteli became president of the Women's Suffrage Association (German: Bernischer Frauenstimmrechtsverein) of Bern in 1964. She wrote pamphlets and went door-to-door trying to introduce equality gently. Rather than a demand for rights, Gosteli's approach focused on increasing women's participation in their communities, as she feared a demand would be resisted by the all-male referendum process. After four years, she became vice president of the Federation of Swiss Women's Associations (German: Bund Schweizerischer Frauenorganisationen) (BSF), and known now as Alliance F. Gosteli became chair of the working group of the BSF for the Political Rights of Women in 1970 and the women targeted the 1971 referendum, participating in various commissions and debates. Finally, on 7 February 1971, two-thirds of the voting men in Switzerland granted women the right to vote at the national level.

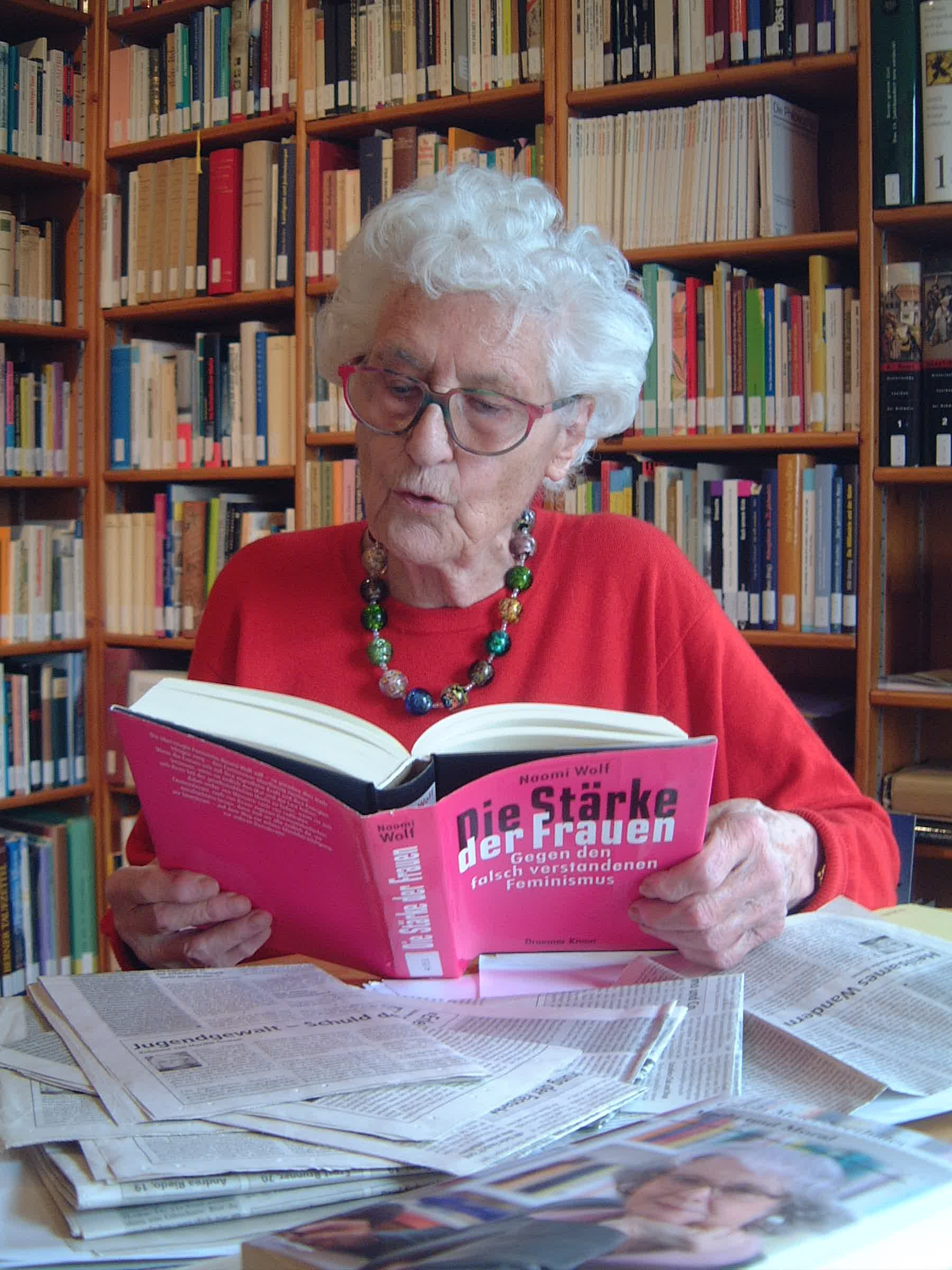
Marthe Gosteli in the archive of woman's history

Quickly the fight then turned toward other inequalities: the right to manage their own bank accounts, equal pay, maternal leave and other women's issues. Gosteli focused her attention on preserving the history of the movement, but her first attempt at establishing an archive of women's history failed. In 1982, she succeeded in establishing the Gosteli Foundation, to preserve and protect the history of Switzerland's women. Starting with a government collection of 19th-century works including books, brochures and magazines, Gosteli added to the collection with private donations from organizations and individuals. Cataloguing and adding the data to the information network of the German-Swiss archive Informationsverbund Deutschschweiz (IDS), the collection grew into an extensive library, which includes historic and biographical material about pioneers and organizations. In January 2014, at the age of 96, Gosteli retired from the archive.

She died on 7 April 2017 at the age of 99.

== Awards and honors ==
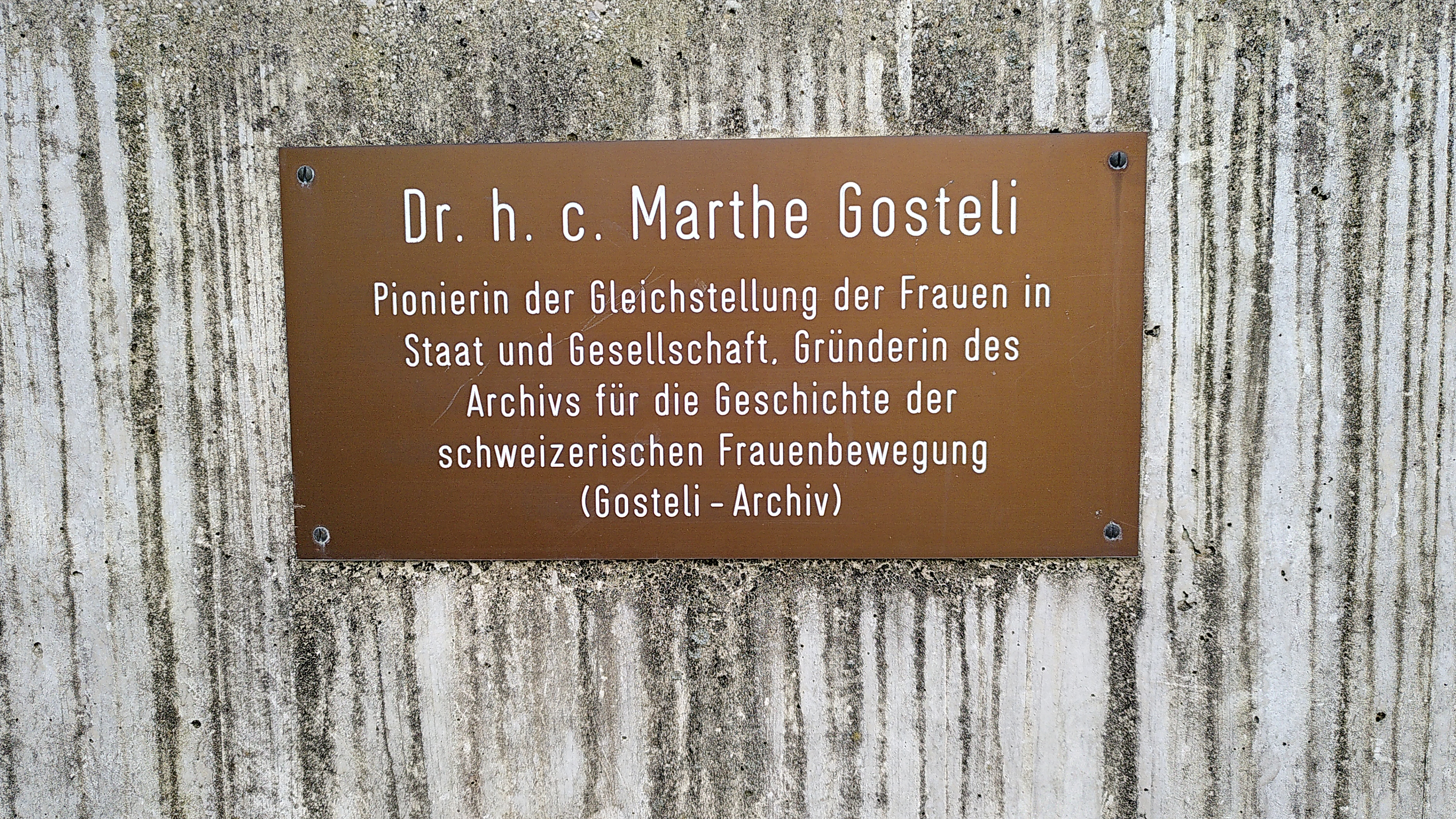
Plaque in honour of Marthe Gosteli

Gosteli received many awards and honours. In 1989 she received the Trudy-Schlatter Prize and in 1992 was honoured with the Medal of the Community of Bern. Gosteli was granted an Honorary doctorate from the University of Bern. In 2008, Gosteli received the Silver Medal of Merit from the Economic and Charitable Society of Bern and in 2011 she was granted the Swiss Human Rights Award.

== Selected works ==
- Gosteli, Marthe; Zürcher, Regula (2000). Vergessene Geschichte: Illustrierte Chronik der Frauenbewegung (in French and German). Bern, Switzerland: Staempfli. ISBN 978-3-7272-9256-9.
- Müller, Verena E.; Gosteli, Marthe (2002). Bewegte Vergangenheit: 20 Jahre Archiv zur Geschichte der Schweizerischen Frauenbewegung (in German). Bern, Switzerland: Stämpfli. ISBN 978-3-7272-1270-3.
- Gosteli, Marthe; Thommen, Silvia (March 2003). "Man muss auch autoritär vorgehen" (in German). Basel, Switzerland: NZZ am Sonntag. OCLC 882729038.
- Gillabert-Randin, Augusta; Moser, Peter; Gosteli, Marthe (2005). Une paysanne entre ferme, marché et associations (in French). Baden, Germany: Hier + Jetzt.
- Gosteli, Marthe; Moser, Peter; Schulz, Kristina (2007). ""Die Welt öffnet sich im Archiv": ein Gespräch mit Marthe Gosteli und Peter Moser im Archiv zur Geschichte der schweizerischen Frauenbewegung". Schweizerische Zeitschrift für Geschichte (in German). 57 (3). Bern, Switzerland: Schweizerischen Gesellschaft für Geschichte: 316–325. OCLC 883884228.
