= List of Swiss suffragists and suffragettes =

This is a list of Swiss suffragists and suffragettes who were born in Switzerland or whose lives and works are closely associated with that country.

== Suffragists and suffragettes ==
- Simone Chapuis-Bischof (1931-2023) – head of the Association Suisse Pour les Droits de la Femme (ADF) and the president of the journal Femmes Suisses
- Caroline Farner (1842–1913) – the second female Swiss doctor
- Marie Goegg-Pouchoulin (1826–1899) – Swiss doctor and campaigner for the Swiss women's movement
- Marthe Gosteli (1917–2017) – Swiss suffrage activist and creator of the Swiss archive of women's history
- Emma Graf (1865–1926) – Swiss historian, educator; president, Bernese Association for Women's Suffrage
- Klara Honegger (1860–1940) – suffragist, pacifist activist and delegate to the International Woman Suffrage Alliance in London
- Ursula Koch (born 1941) – politician, refused the 'male' oath in the Zürich cantonal parliament; first women president of the Social Democratic Party of Switzerland (SP)
- Emilie Lieberherr (1924–2011) – Swiss politician who was a leading figure in the final struggle for women suffrage in Switzerland, and the famous 1969 March to Bern for women suffrage
- Rosa Neuenschwander (1883–1962) – pioneer in vocational education, founder of the Schweizerische Landfrauenverband or SLFV (Swiss Country Association for Women Suffrage)
- Camille Vidart (1854–1930) – suffragist, women's rights activist, pacifist and educator
- Julie von May (von Rued) (1808–1875) – feminist
- Helene von Mülinen (1850–1924) – founder of Switzerland's organized suffrage movement; created and served as first president of Bund Schweizerischer Frauenvereine (BSF)

== See also ==
- List of suffragists and suffragettes
- Timeline of women's suffrage
