= Uchtenhagen =

Uchtenhagen is a German surname. Notable people with the surname include:

- Ambros Uchtenhagen (1928–2022), Swiss psychiatrist
- Lilian Uchtenhagen (1928–2016), Swiss economist and politician, wife of Ambros
