= Renchen =

- City
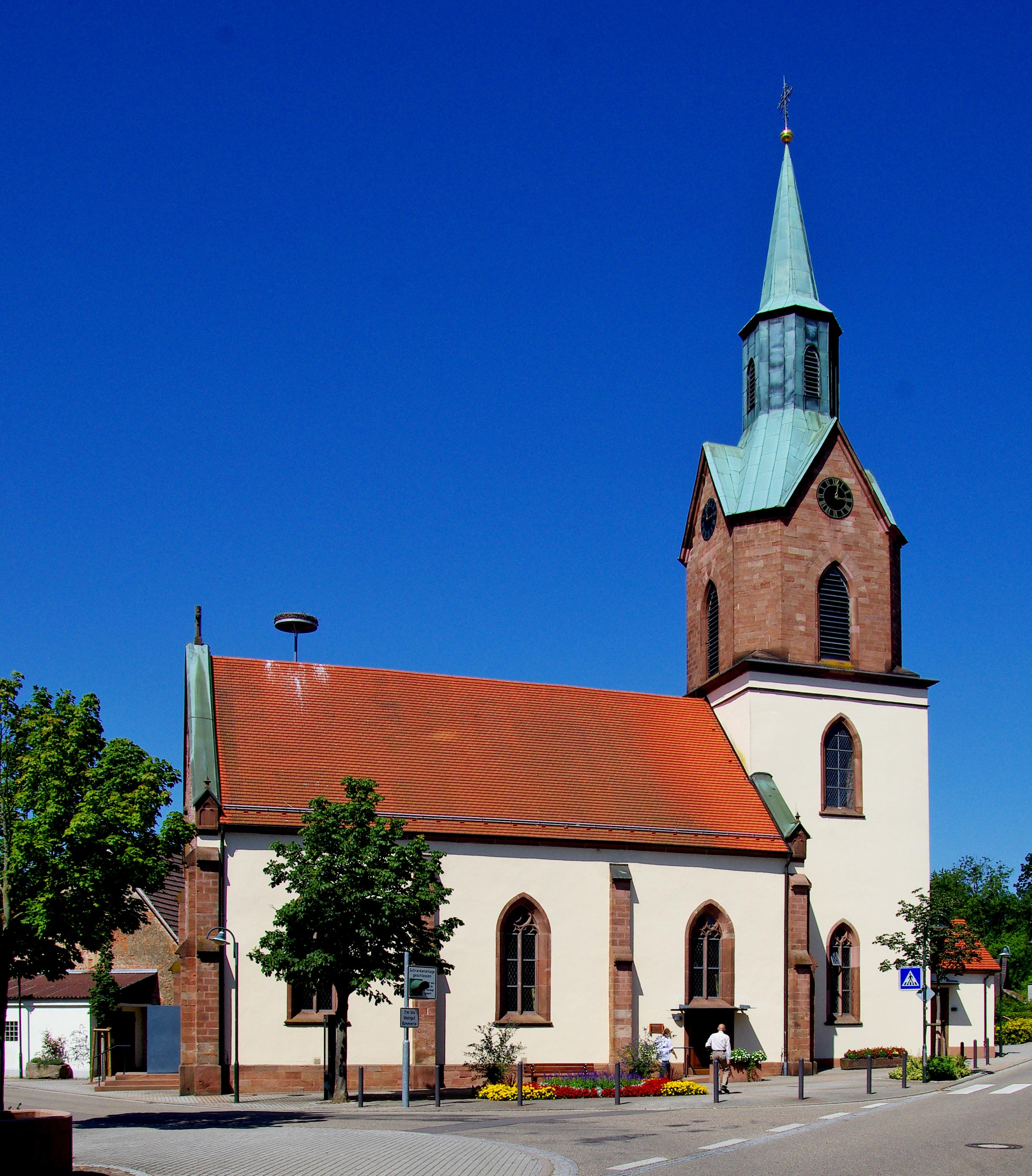
- Church of Saint Anastasius in Erlach

- Coat of arms

- Location of Renchen within Ortenaukreis district
- Interactive map of Renchen
- Location within Germany Location within Baden-Württemberg
- Coordinates: 48°35′09″N 08°00′38″E
- Country: Germany
- State: Baden-Württemberg
- Admin. region: Freiburg
- District: Ortenaukreis

Government
  - Mayor (2016–24): Bernd Siefermann (CDU)

Area
  - Total: 32.08 km^{2} (12.39 sq mi)
- Elevation: 150 m (490 ft)

Population (2025-12-31)
  - Total: 7,568
  - Density: 235.9/km^{2} (611.0/sq mi)
- Time zone: UTC+01:00 (CET)
  - Summer (DST): UTC+02:00 (CEST)
- Postal codes: 77871
- Dialling codes: 07843
- Vehicle registration: OG, BH, KEL, LR, WOL
- Website: https://www.renchen.de/

Renchen (German pronunciation: [ˈʁɛnçn̩]; Low Alemannic: Renche) is a small city in Baden-Württemberg, Germany, part of the district of Ortenau.

== Geography ==
Renchen is located in the foothills of the northern Black Forest at the entrance to the Rench valley at the edge of the Upper Rhine River Plains.

=== Neighboring communities ===
The city shares borders with the following cities and towns, listed clock-wise from the north: Achern, Kappelrodeck, Oberkirch, Appenweier, and Rheinau.

=== Boroughs ===
In addition to Renchen (proper) the city includes the boroughs of Erlach and Ulm zu Renchen.

== History ==
Renchen was first in official documents in 1115. In 1326 it received a town charter but the town lost it again as well as all significance when it was destroyed during the Thirty Years' War. In 1838 the Grand Duke of Baden again granted a town charter to Renchen but it again lost the right to call itself a town as a result of the German district reform in 1935. Renchen then received a town charter for the third time in 1950 in recognition of its historic importance.

Renchen's borough of Ulm zu Renchen is known mostly for its Ulmer Bier, a specialty beer brewed only at full moon.

== Government ==
=== Town council ===
As of February 2006, Renchen's city council has the following composition:

Party	Seats
CDU	8
SPD	4
Independents	8

Elections in May 2014:

- FWV: 8 seats
- CDU: 6 seats
- SPD: 4 seats

=== Mayors ===
- 1945: Albert Dietrich
- -1969: Franz Brandstetter
- 1969-1985: Erich Huber
- 1985–2000: Klaus Brodbeck
- since 2000: Bernd Siefermann

== People, culture & architecture ==
=== Grimmelshausen Prize ===
The Grimmelshausen Prize is a literary prize of €10,000 awarded in odd-number years on September 15, in turn, by Renchen or the city of Gelnhausen.

== Economy and infrastructure ==
=== Media ===
In Renchen the Offenburger Tageblatt publishes a daily local edition as "Acher-Rench-Zeitung" and the Stattzeitung für Südbaden is an alternative magazine offered in the area.

== Sons and daughters of the town ==
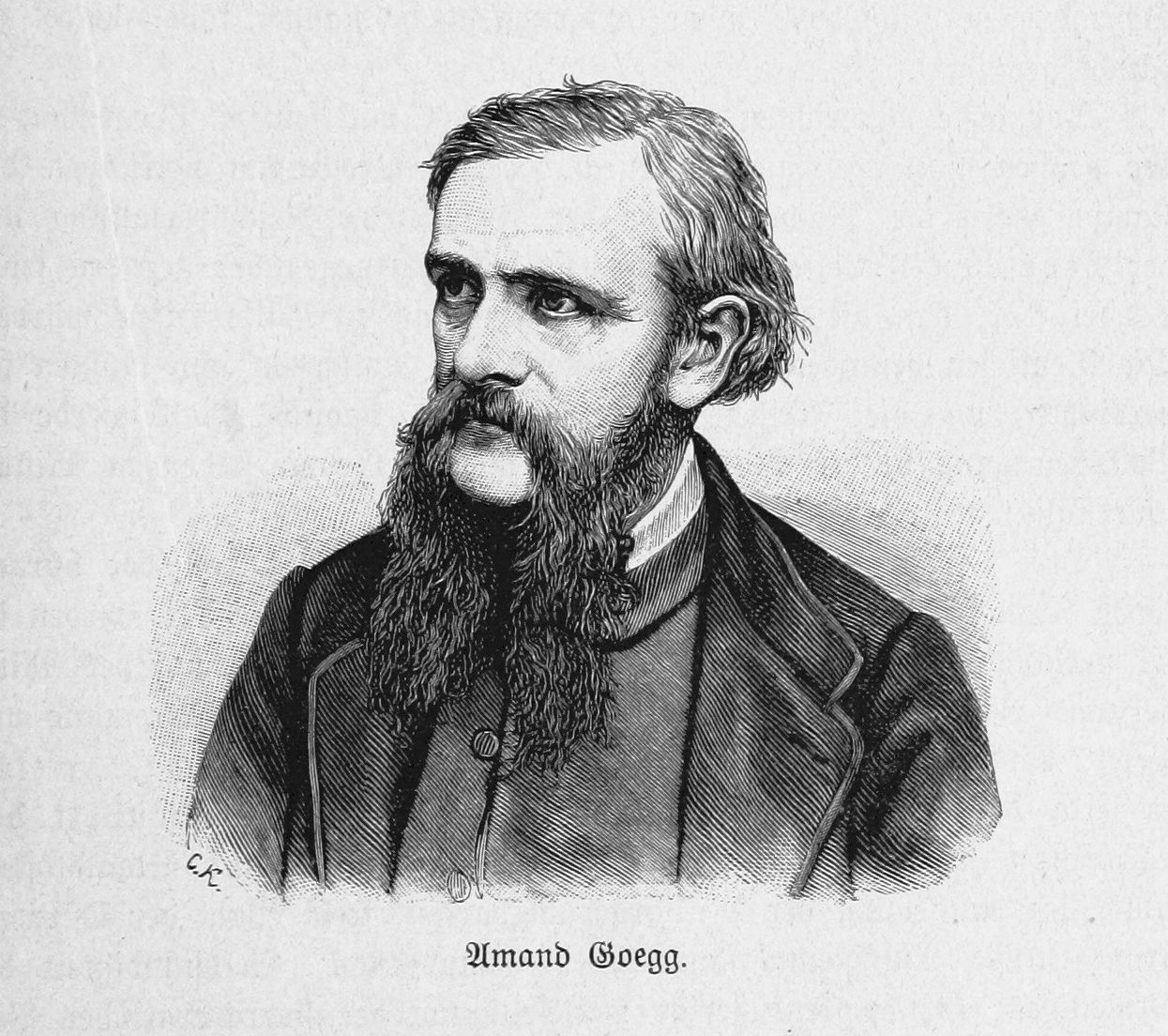
Amand Goegg in 1893

- Amand Goegg (1820–1897), Baden freedom fighter, honorary citizen of the city Geneva, married the women's rights activist Marie Goegg-Pouchoulin
- Hermann Hohn (1897–1968), Wehrmacht general
- Martin Knosp (born 1959), wrestler, World Champion 1981
- Norbert Dobeleit (born 1964), athlete, medalist at the Seoul Summer Olympic Games 1988

== Famous people ==
Renchen likes to call itself the city of Grimmelshausen, as the poet Hans Jakob Christoffel von Grimmelshausen, author of Der Abenteuerliche Simplicissimus Teutsch, served from 1667 until his death in 1676 as the Bishop of Strasbourg's executor in Renchen.
