= Martha Ribi =

Swiss politician

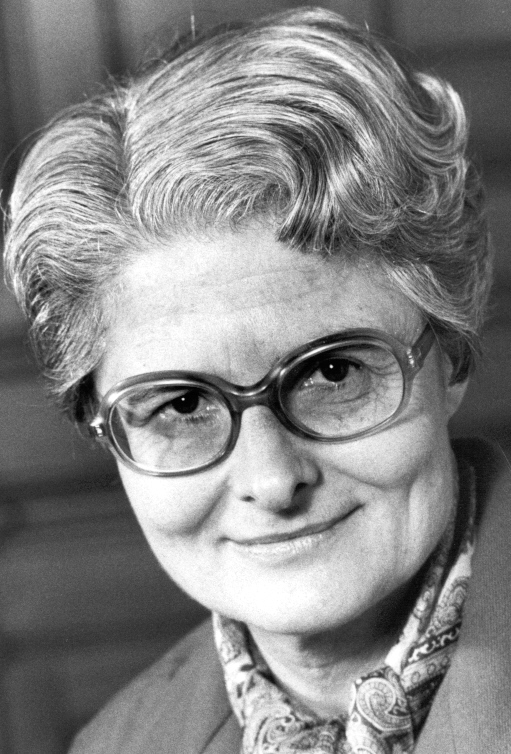
Martha Ribi

Martha Ribi-Raschle (28 November 1915 – 4 October 2010) was a Swiss politician of the Free Democratic Party (FDP). She was among the first women to seat in the National Council in 1971.

== Biography ==
She was born on 28 November 1915 in Zürich. She was the daughter of a bank employee. She obtained the matura in 1935 and stayed in Italy and England to learn languages. She got married in 1936. After the early death of her husband, she worked as a secretary for the medical service of the City of Zürich from 1945 to 1977 before she became an adjunct professor in 1964. In the meantime, she studied economics at the University of Zurich from 1957 to 1963 and earned a licentiate degree.

She joined the Free Democratic Party of Switzerland in 1963 and became a member of the party's Women's Union (SVFF). In 1970, she unsuccessfully stood in the Zürich communal council election. After women's suffrage was introduced in the canton of Zürich, Ribi was elected to the Cantonal Council of Zürich in Zürich's 2nd constituency in 1971.

In the October 31, 1971 federal election, Ribi was elected as a National Councillor. She represented the FDP party during three terms until 1983. She was among the first ten women to ever seat in the National Council, and one of the three earliest female representatives of the canton of Zürich alongside Hedi Lang and Lilian Uchtenhagen.

Besides her short term as the deputy chairwoman of the FDP, she was recognised for her work in social and healthcare policy in the Federal Assembly. She published her opinions in professional journals. Moreover, she was the chairwoman of the Association of the Ergotherapeutic School of Zürich.

She died on 4 October 2010 in Uster.

== Bibliography ==
- Silke Redolfi: Ribi, Martha in German, French and Italian in the online Historical Dictionary of Switzerland.
- Biography of Martha Ribi on the website of the Swiss Parliament.
