= Caroline de Barrau =

French educationalist, feminist, author and philanthropist

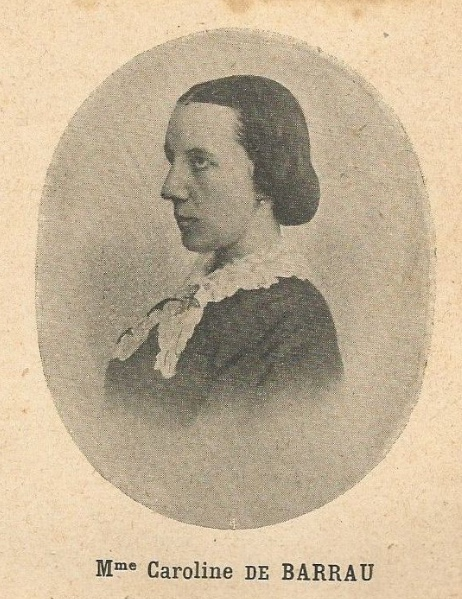
- Born: Caroline-Françoise Coulomb; 1828; Paris, France
- Died: 1888 (aged 59–60); Paris, France
- Occupations: Educationalist, feminist, author and philanthropist

Caroline de Barrau (1828–1888) was a wealthy French educationalist, feminist, author and philanthropist. She became interested in the education of girls, created a school in Paris where her daughter was taught, and encouraged her daughter and other young women to successfully apply for admission to the University of Paris, previously a male-only institution. She belonged to international feminist associations, investigated the conditions of working women in Paris, was a leader in the campaign to eliminate state-regulated prostitution, helped prostitutes reenter society after being released from prison and provided aid to abandoned infants. She was the author of several books on women's issues.

== Life ==
Caroline-Françoise Coulomb was born in Paris in 1828. Her family was of wealthy Protestant landowners. She was well-educated in the Greek and Latin classics, modern languages and music. In 1848 she married M. de Barrau de Muratel, an embassy attaché, and during her marriage lived in the Montagnet chateau at Montagne-Noire du Tarn, above Sorèze. Caroline de Barrau was simultaneously pro-republican and elitist. Although both cosmopolitan and an early feminist, she was a patriot during the Franco-Prussian War (1870–71). She converted her Montagnet chateau into a hospital, where she brought forty wounded from the battlefield of the Loire. They were infected by smallpox, but thirty-nine survived. She took an interest in psychic phenomena. Dr. Charles Richet said he met Madame Blavatsky through her, and she also belonged to the circle of Dr. Paul Gibier.

== Educationalist ==
Caroline de Barrau became interested in educational issues, and won the respect of Élisa Lemonnier, founder of schools for professional training of women, while raising her own children. She gathered children of both sexes around her daughter and two sons, and chose teachers to work under her direction. The improvised school was very successful. Caroline de Barrau moved to Paris when needed for the education of her children and other pupils, and opened her home to young medical students, mostly foreign. She gave some of them financial support. Caroline de Barrau thought that women were prohibited from attending public universities in France more by custom than for legal reasons. The solution was to prepare women adequately for university study, and then enroll them. Her daughter Emilie, with other young women "intellectually prepared for work of university grade, appeared at the proper time and place for enrollment." They were admitted to study medicine at the University of Paris.

The Berry family, headed by a civil servant named Gabriel Berry, lived with the Barrau family in their spacious villa in Paris and shared their commitment to giving their children an advanced education. Madame Berry managed domestic arrangements while Madame de Barrau formulated the educational theories and plans. The Berrys were the in-laws of Theodore Stanton. His sister Harriot Stanton Blatch visited them in Paris in 1881, and described Caroline de Barrau as "an exceptional daughter of France of the aristocratic, protestant element." Harriot recorded, "It was during this visit in Paris that Madame de Barrau broached the idea that ... I should return for the winter to study economics at the famous School of Political Economy" in Paris. In 1883 Caroline de Barrau escorted Susan B. Anthony around Paris. Anthony was grateful for the fact that she spoke English.

In 1884 the French Chamber's budget commission considered eliminating all inspectresses general of nursery schools. The women's teachers' journal L'Ami de l'enfance, co-edited by Pauline Kergomard and Charles Defodon, raised the alarm. Defodon praised the inspectorate as a French tradition that made use of women's distinctive maternal talents. Caroline de Barrau noted that nursery schools had been founded as an initiative of women which the state then chose to support. She disparaged the regime by comparison to its predecessors, who had introduced inspectresses general. The unsatisfactory compromise was to dismiss or retire four of the inspectresses and retain the other four. In 1886–87 she and her friend Pauline Kergomard founded the Union française pour le sauvetage de l'Enfance (French union for rescuing children). This society gave aid to children who had been abandoned.

== Feminist ==
In 1866 a feminist group called the Société pour la Revendication du Droit des Femmes began to meet at the house of André Léo. Members included Paule Minck, Louise Michel, Eliska Vincent, Élie Reclus and his wife Noémie, Mme Jules Simon and Caroline de Barrau. Maria Deraismes also participated. Because of the broad range of opinions, the group decided to focus on the subject of improving girls' education. Caroline de Barrau was a member of the Association internationale des femmes (AIF) formed in 1868. By 1872 the AIF was viewed with suspicion, since the word "International" was associated with the Paris Commune, and was divided over the leadership of Marie Goegg. In June 1872 Caroline de Barrau was one of the signatories of a communiqué calling for a meeting at the home of Julie von May von Rued in Bern to organize a new association called Solidarité: Association pour la défense des droits de la femme (Solidarity: Association for the Defense of Women's Rights). Other signatories included Josephine Butler, Christine Lazzati, Rosalie Schönwasser, Marianne Menzzer and Julie Kühne.

At the 1877 congress in Geneva of the International Federation for the Abolition of Regulated Prostitution Caroline de Barrau reported that women workers in Paris, mostly employed seasonally, earned about two francs per day on average. This was a starvation wage. In an ordinance of 16 June 1879 the police authorized establishment of a French section of the Federation for the Abolition of Prostitution, called the Association pour l'abolition de la prostitution réglementée, with Victor Schœlcher (1804–1893) as president. The association included feminists, radicals and abolitionists. The most active organizers of the French Association for the Abolition of Official Prostitution were the feminist leaders Maria Deraismes, Emilie de Morsier and Caroline de Barrau. For some years Caroline de Barrau led the institution of the Libérées de Saint-Lazare, which helped former prisoners of Saint-Lazare, mostly prostitutes, to return to society.

Caroline de Barrau died in Paris in 1888.

== Works ==
- Barrau, Caroline de (1868). Élisa Lemonnier, fondatrice de la Société pour l'enseignement professionnel des femmes. impr. de É. Voitelain. p. 8.
- Molin, Isaure André du; Barrau, Caroline de (1870). Journal et fragments. J. Cherbuliez. p. 332.
- Barrau, Caroline de (1870). La femme et l'éducation. Librairie de Jöel Cherbuliez. p. 268.
- Leblois, Louis; Barrau, Caroline De (1870). La mission de la femme et en particulier son rôle dans l'éducation religieuse de l'enfance. J. Cherbuliez. p. 162.
- Barrau, Caroline de (1878). Étude sur le salaire du travail féminin à Paris. Fédération britannique, continentale et générale. p. 66.
- Barrau, Caroline de (1884). Les Femmes de la campagne à Paris.

== Sources ==
- Clark, Linda L. (2000-12-21). The Rise of Professional Women in France: Gender and Public Administration since 1830. Cambridge University Press. ISBN 978-1-139-42686-2.
- Corbin, Alain (1996-09-01). Women for Hire: Prostitution and Sexuality in France After 1850. Harvard University Press. ISBN 978-0-674-95544-8.
- DuBois, Ellen Carol (1999-10-01). Harriot Stanton Blatch and the Winning of Woman Suffrage. Yale University Press. ISBN 978-0-300-08068-1.
- Gordon, Ann (2009-06-10). The Selected Papers of Elizabeth Cady Stanton and Susan B. Anthony: Their Place Inside the Body-Politic, 1887 to 1895. Rutgers University Press. ISBN 978-0-8135-6440-1.
- Guénon, René (2004). The Spiritist Fallacy. Sophia Perennis. ISBN 978-0-900588-72-3.
- Kergomard, Pauline (2014). "Barrau (Madame de)". Institute Français de l'éducation.
- McMillan, James F. (2002-01-08). France and Women, 1789-1914: Gender, Society and Politics. Routledge. p. 130. ISBN 978-1-134-58957-9.
- Offen, Karen M. (2000). European Feminisms, 1700-1950: A Political History. Stanford University Press. ISBN 978-0-8047-3420-2.
- Stanton, Elizabeth Cady (2006-07-18). The Selected Papers of Elizabeth Cady Stanton and Susan B. Anthony: When clowns make laws for queens 1880 to 1887. Rutgers University Press. ISBN 978-0-8135-2320-0.
