= Alaide =

Alaide or Alaíde is a feminine given name. Notable people with this name include:

- Alaíde Costa (born 1935), Brazilian singer-songwriter
- Alaíde Foppa (1914 – disappeared 1980), Guatemalan academic
- Alaide Gualberta Beccari (1842–1906), Italian feminist
