= Marianne Menzzer =

German feminist

- Born: 25 November 1814
- Died: 5 June 1895 (aged 80)
- Occupation: Feminist
- Known for: Statistical methods

Marianne Menzzer (25 November 1814 – 5 June 1895) was a German feminist who used statistics to demonstrate discrimination against women in the workplace.

== Life ==
Marianne Menzzer was born on 25 November 1814. As was the case with many activist feminists in Germany, she did not marry. A freethinker, for decades she cooperated with the Protestants Louise Otto-Peters and Auguste Schmidt and the Jewish Henriette Goldschmidt. She campaigned for the equality of the sexes, particularly in Dresden. She was a co-founder to the Dresdner Rechtsschutzvereins für Frauen (Dresden Women's Protection Society). She assisted Louise Otto-Peters in the Allgemeinen Deutschen Frauenvereins (General German Women's Association). She was an energetic participant in the Dresdner Frauenerwerbsverein (Dresden Working Women's Club), founded in 1871.

Marie Goegg-Pouchoulin and her associates in Geneva revived the Association internationale des femmes after peace returned following the Franco-Prussian War of 1870. In March 1872 the AIF split due to an attack on Goegg's leadership and suspicion about the term "international", which suggested the revolutionary ideas of the Paris Commune. In mid-1872 a group of AIF members formed a new organization called Solidarité: Association pour le Défense des Droits de la Femme (Solidarity: Association for the Defense of Women's Rights). Founding members included Josephine Butler of England, Caroline de Barrau of France, Christine Lazzati of Milan, and from Germany Rosalie Schönwasser (Düsseldorf), Marianne Menzzer (Dresden) and Julie Kühne (Stettin).

After the Anti-Socialist Laws (1878–90) were passed, the leaders of the German women's movement tried to avoid any suspicion of revolutionary aspirations. However, in 1881 Marianne Menzzer spoke at the General Assembly of the General German Women's Association on the sad plight of women workers, who wanted equal pay for equal work, a principal that had long been established in England and France. The meeting recommended moral influence on employers and boycott by women of businesses that did not comply. Marianne Menzzer was one of the first to apply the methods of social science to gender issues, producing the first statistical information to support discussions about the inequality of women workers. She died on 5 June 1895 at the age of 80.

== Legacy ==
The Marianne Menzzer Prize is awarded by the PRO-state association of Saxony in cooperation with the coordinating body for the promotion of equal opportunities at Saxon universities and colleges for outstanding completion of work in the field of gender studies.

== Sources ==
- Braun, Lily (1901). "Die Bürgerliche Frauenbewegung Und Ihre Stellung Zur Arbeiterinnenfrage". Die Frauenfrage: ihre geschichtliche Entwicklung und wirtschaftliche Seite.
- Dollard, Catherine L. (2013-07-15). The Surplus Woman: Unmarried in Imperial Germany, 1871-1918. Berghahn Books. ISBN 978-0-85745-600-7.
- "Marianne Menzzer Preis". Koordinierungsstelle zur Förderung der Chancengleichheit an sächsischen Universitäten und Hochschulen.
- Offen, Karen M. (2000). European Feminisms, 1700-1950: A Political History. Stanford University Press. ISBN 978-0-8047-3420-2.
- Steinberg, Swen; Müller, Winfried (2014). Wirtschaft und Gemeinschaft: Konfessionelle und neureligiöse Gemeinsinnsmodelle im 19. und 20. Jahrhundert (in German). transcript Verlag. ISBN 978-3-8394-2406-3.
