= Association pour la défense de la Femme av droit =

Women's organization in Switzerland

Association pour la défense de la Femme av droit, commonly known as Solidarité, was a women's organization in Switzerland, founded in 1872.

The organization was founded by Marie Goegg-Pouchoulin after the dissolution of the Association Internationale des Femmes: Goegg-Pouchoulin served as chairperson of the Solidarité between 1875 and 1880. After a campaign initiated by Goegg-Pouchoulin the year of its foundation, women were given access to the University of Geneva. In 1880, the Solidarité was dissolved.
