= Alaide Gualberta Beccari =

Italian feminist, republican, pacifist and social reformer

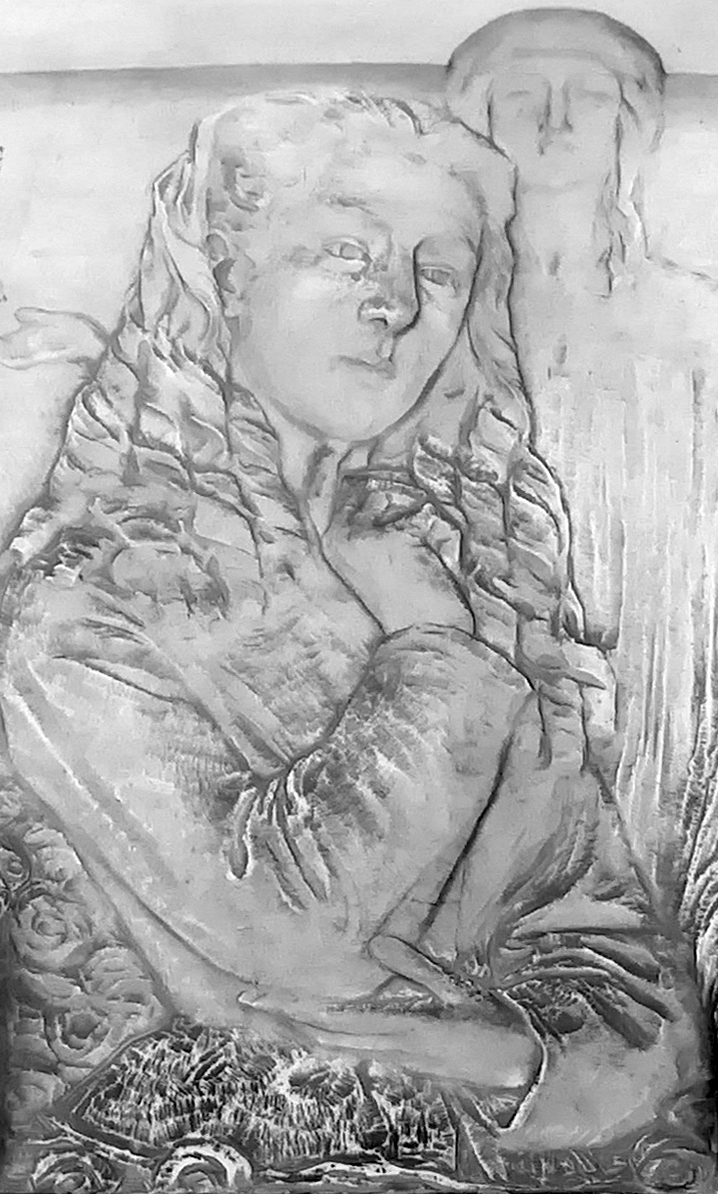

Alaide Gualberta Beccari (born 1842 in Padua – died 1906) was an Italian feminist, republican, pacifist, and social reformer, who published the feminist journal Woman during the 1870s and 1880s.

== Biography ==
Alaide Beccari was born in Padua in 1842, the only one of her parents' 12 children to survive to adulthood. Beccari's father was a civil servant in Padua, which was part of the Austro-Hungarian Empire at the time. Beccari's father was a supporter of Italian unification and joined the Risorgimento during the uprisings of 1848. When the uprising failed, he fled to Turin. She worked as her father's secretary for a time, then returned to Padua when it was captured by the forces of Lombardy-Venetia.

At age 16, Beccari was living in Venice, where she launched the journal Woman.

== Woman ==
The journal Woman was published biweekly. Beccari's publication promoted women's rights following Italian unification in 1861. She was a social reformer, when moral and political reform were gaining popular support in Great Britain, France, the United States, and elsewhere as part of a larger Reform movement during the 19th century.

Woman was a rare feminist voice in Italy during the 1870s and 1880s, and in the language of the period, it supported "woman's emancipation". Beccari, like other Italian feminists of her generation (such as Erminia Fuà, Aurelia Cimino Folliero, Sara Nathan, Giovanna Garcea, and Adelaide Cairoli) equated women's emancipation with Italian unification politics, referring to "the woman's Risorgimento". The journal Woman gave coverage to Anna Maria Mozzoni, who fought to reform Italy's laws regulating legalized prostitution. Mozzoni and Beccari publicized the concept of the "citizen woman" and "patriot mother". Woman also promoted the causes of Josephine Butler. Articles originally printed in Woman were translated and published abroad, in England's feminist journal Englishwoman's Review. In 1877, Woman held a petition drive, garnering 3000 signatures in support of women's suffrage in Italy.

Beccari believed that women could offer a nurturing counterbalance to masculine "militarism". She supported pacifist causes, and Woman frequently gave coverage to pacifist organizations, such as the founding of the International Association of Women (IAW) by Marie Goegg in Geneva in 1870.

Beccari also wrote plays. She wrote Un caso di divorzio (A Case of Divorce), performed in 1881, which in retrospect has been criticized on its literary quality as "sentimental" and "predictable"; notably, there is no marriage for the second "wife" in the drama. However, the play is noteworthy for having been written and produced. Women writers in Italy were rare at the time, as most women were illiterate in Italy, and only a handful of other women were writing and producing plays in Italy during the period; Luisa Marenco-Martini-Bernardi, Irma Meladny Scodnik, and Amelia Rosselli were other women playwrights during this era in Italy. Women's suffrage came to Italy only with the collapse of the Fascist regime in 1945; divorce would be legalized in Italy only in 1970.

Beccari was forced to end her editorship of Woman in 1887 due to ill health; Emilia Mariani took over as the editor of Woman.

== Later years ==
Beccari continued writing, establishing a children's magazine called Mamma. She offered support to other women writers trying to launch their careers.

Beccari was discouraged by the lack of popular support for women's causes in Italy. She became a vocal supporter of socialism, which resulted in a loss of support from moderate feminists.

== See also ==
- List of peace activists
