= Emma Graf =

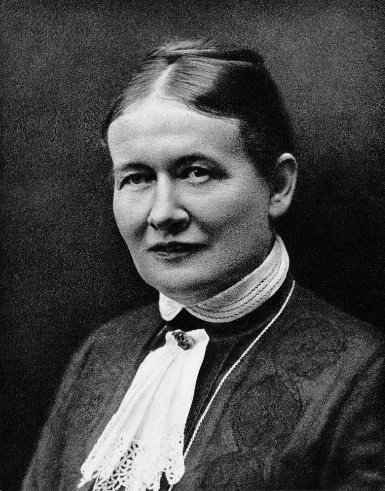
- Emma Graf in 1910
- Born: October 11, 1865; Bern, Switzerland
- Died: November 22, 1926 (aged 61)
- Education: University of Bern

Emma Graf (October 11, 1865 – November 22, 1926) was a Swiss historian, teacher, and campaigner for women's suffrage in Switzerland.

== Early life and education ==
Emma Graf was the daughter of a hardware store manager and an innkeeper. She was apprenticed as a linen maid. With the financial support of her aunt, Graf began studying to become a teacher at the pedagogical seminary in Hindelbank. She attended courses in history, German language, and literature at the University of Bern. In 1903, she published her thesis entitled Rahel Varnhagen und die Romantik (Rahel Varnhagen and Romanticism in French) and obtained her doctorate.

== Career ==
In 1904, she became editor of the Journal des institutrices. As head of the Swiss Association of Schoolteachers, she campaigned for better training, working conditions, and pay for schoolteachers. In 1907, Graf became the first associate professor in Switzerland.

She participated in the feminist movement and fought for legal and political equality for women. In 1912, she joined the Bernese Association for Women's Suffrage and became its president. Thanks to her campaign, in 1917, the communes of the Canton of Bern granted women the passive right to vote in municipal affairs.

In 1915/16, she co-initiated the collection of donations for sick soldiers and their families. In 1915, she founded the Swiss Women's Yearbook in three languages, editing the first five volumes. The publication's aim was to bear witness to the work and aspirations of Swiss women. In 1921, she was elected president of the Second Congrès suisse pour les intérêts féminins (Swiss National Congress for Women's Interests) in Geneva, where the economic, social, and family tasks of Swiss women were discussed.
