= Simone Chapuis-Bischof =

Swiss activist (1931–2023)

Simone Chapuis-Bischof (16 March 1931 – 9 October 2023) was a Swiss activist. She was an organizer for women's suffrage in Switzerland. She was also the head of the Association Suisse Pour les Droits de la Femme (ADF or in English, the Swiss Association for the Rights of Women), and the president of the journal, Femmes Suisses.

== Biography ==
Chapuis-Bischof was born in Bâle. When she was eight, her family moved to Lausanne.

Chapuis-Bischof became a teacher in the canton of Vaud. She traced the beginnings of her activism to 1959, when she discovered that men at her school were earning 30% more than women with the same qualifications. She began to work towards equal rights afterwards, dedicating herself to women's suffrage, educational access, equal pay for equal work, maternity benefits and the decriminalization of abortion. She worked as an activist for the right of women to vote, which Swiss women were finally fully granted in 1971.

Chapuis-Bischof became active in the Association lausannoise pour le suffrage féminin (Lausanne Association for Women's Suffrage) and later was president from 1971 to 1974. She later became president of the cantonal-level association from 1974 to 1980.

In 2011, Chapuis-Bischof was given the award, “Femme exilée, femme engagée” (exiled woman, committed women), from the town of Geneva.

Simone Chapuis-Bischof died on 9 October 2023, at the age of 92.
