= 1959 Swiss referendums =

Two referendums were held in Switzerland in 1959. The first was held on 1 February on the introduction of women's suffrage at the federal level, but was rejected by 67% of voters. The second was held on 24 May on adding article 22bis to the federal constitution, which concerned civil protection. It was approved by 62% of voters.

== Results ==
=== February: Women's suffrage ===
Results of the women's suffrage referendum by canton

Choice	Popular vote		Cantons		
Choice	Votes	%	Full	Half	Total
For	323,727	33.1	3	0	3
Against	654,939	66.9	16	6	19
Blank votes	7,497	–	–	–	–
Invalid votes	1,680	–	–	–	–
Total	987,843	100	19	6	22
Registered voters/turnout	1,480,555	66.7	–	–	–
Source: Nohlen & Stöver

==== By canton ====
Canton	For	%	Against	%	Turnout
Zurich	71,859	36.20	126,670	63.80	77.12
Bern	55,786	35.46	101,543	64.54	62.17
Lucerne	10,294	21.34	37,934	78.66	69.87
Uri	885	14.58	5,183	85.42	71.17
Schwyz	1,968	14.23	11,860	85.77	65.58
Obwalden	565	14.34	3,376	85.66	62.64
Nidwalden	807	19.50	3,331	80.50	71.75
Glarus	1,455	19.11	6,159	80.89	70.74
Zug	2,046	24.26	6,387	75.74	65.03
Fribourg	7,985	29.83	18,780	70.17	58.72
Solothurn	11,447	30.01	26,692	69.99	70.24
Basel-Stadt	17,013	46.76	19,372	53.24	54.35
Basel-Landschaft	8,896	37.28	14,969	62.72	63.14
Schaffhausen	4,782	31.89	10,212	68.11	86.63
Appenzell Ausserrhoden	1,517	15.48	8,284	84.52	73.35
Appenzell Innerrhoden	105	4.87	2,050	95.13	60.31
St. Gallen	12,436	19.33	51,912	80.67	74.98
Grisons	5,633	22.36	19,562	77.64	67.83
Aargau	17,919	22.76	60,825	77.24	84.91
Thurgau	6,721	19.94	26,986	80.06	78.63
Ticino	10,738	37.08	18,218	62.92	56.81
Vaud	32,929	51.30	31,254	48.70	54.39
Valais	8,242	30.52	18,759	69.48	55.43
Neuchâtel	13,938	52.18	12,775	47.82	64.41
Geneva	17,761	59.99	11,846	40.01	45.01
Source: Swissvotes

=== May: Constitutional amendment ===
Choice	Popular vote		Cantons		
Choice	Votes	%	Full	Half	Total
For	380,631	62.3	19	6	22
Against	230,701	37.7	0	0	0
Blank votes	21,623	–	–	–	–
Invalid votes	1,189	–	–	–	–
Total	634,144	100	19	6	22
Registered voters/turnout	1,479,566	42.9	–	–	–
Source: Nohlen & Stöver

== See also ==
- Women's suffrage in Switzerland
- 1971 Swiss referendums, when women's suffrage was approved
