= Women's suffrage in Switzerland =

Women in Switzerland gained the right to vote in federal elections after a referendum in February 1971. The first federal vote in which women were able to participate was the 31 October 1971 election of the Federal Assembly. However it was not until a 1990 decision by the Federal Supreme Court of Switzerland that women gained full voting rights in the final Swiss canton of Appenzell Innerrhoden.

An earlier referendum on women's suffrage was held on 1 February 1959 and was rejected by the majority (67%) of Switzerland's men. Despite this, in some French-speaking cantons women obtained the right to vote in cantonal referendums. The first Swiss woman to hold political office, Trudy Späth-Schweizer, was elected to the municipal government of Riehen in 1958.

== Swiss political system and universal suffrage ==
The principal reason for the delay of the Swiss relative to the other European countries was the importance of direct democracy in the political system. The introduction of federal and cantonal universal suffrage necessitated the vote of the majority of the electors, men in this case, for a referendum. Moreover, a new federal constitutional reform likewise had to be approved by the majority of the cantons. Another reason was the tight connection, since the constitution of 1848, between the right to vote and military service in the Swiss Army, which was compulsory for men.

Direct democracy also allowed the introduction of woman suffrage via the initiative. Many cantons had initiatives for the right to vote prior to 1971. For example, the canton of Basel-Stadt had referendums on women's suffrage in 1920, 1927, and 1946.

== Representation of women in political institutions ==
=== Federal Assembly ===
The number of women in the houses of the Federal Assembly of Switzerland increased. In Swiss National Council it went from 10 in 1971 to 50 in 2003, and from 1 to 11 in the 46-member Swiss Council of States. As of 2015 there were 64 women out of 200 members (32%) in the National Council and 7 out of 46 (15.2%) in the Council of States.

Lise Girardin (member of FDP.The Liberals) served as the first female Councillor of States from 1971 to 1975, and was also the first mayor of a Swiss city, namely Geneva in 1968.

==== The first women elected in 1971 in the Swiss parliament ====
Elisabeth Blunschy

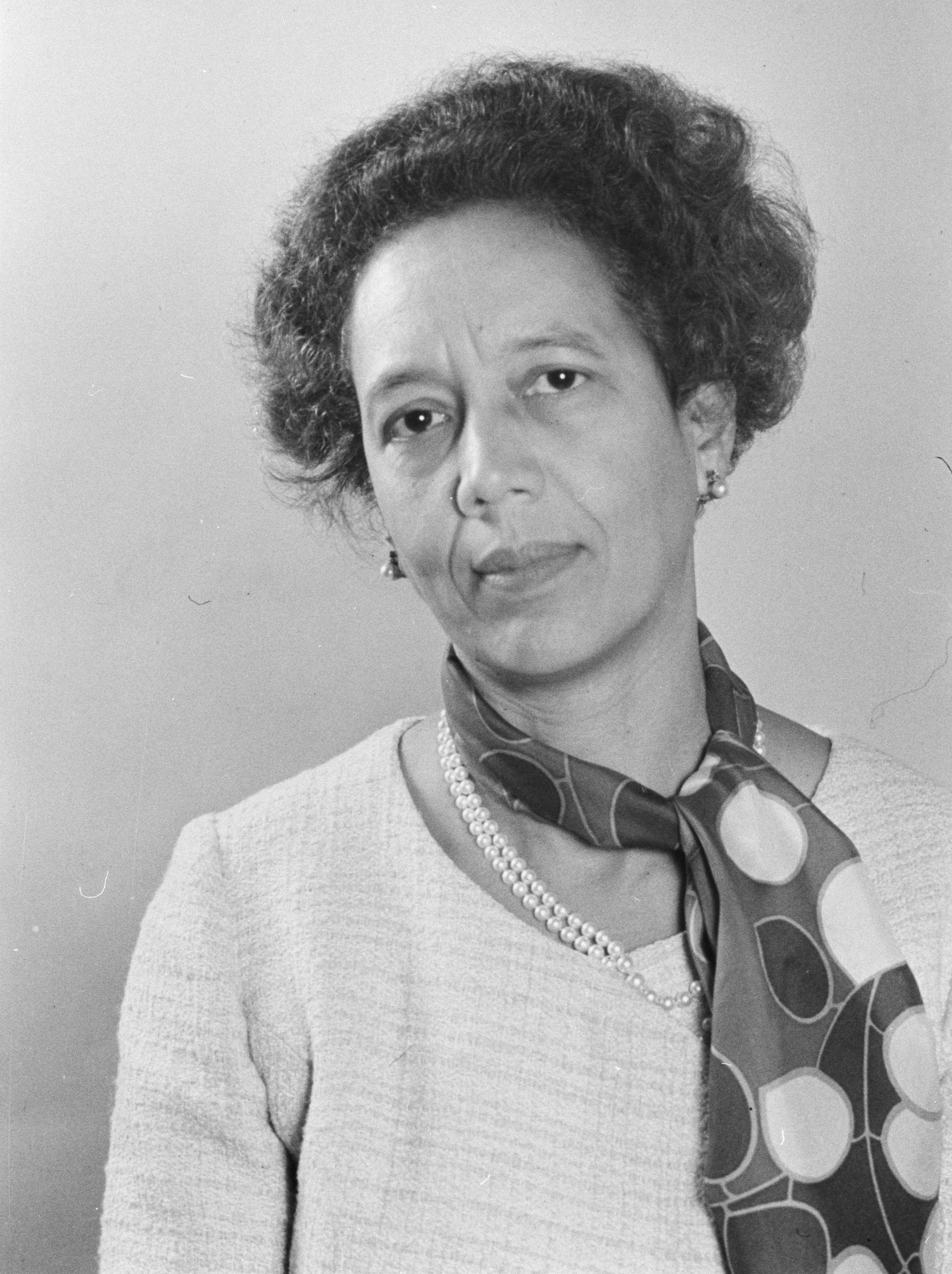
Tilo Frey

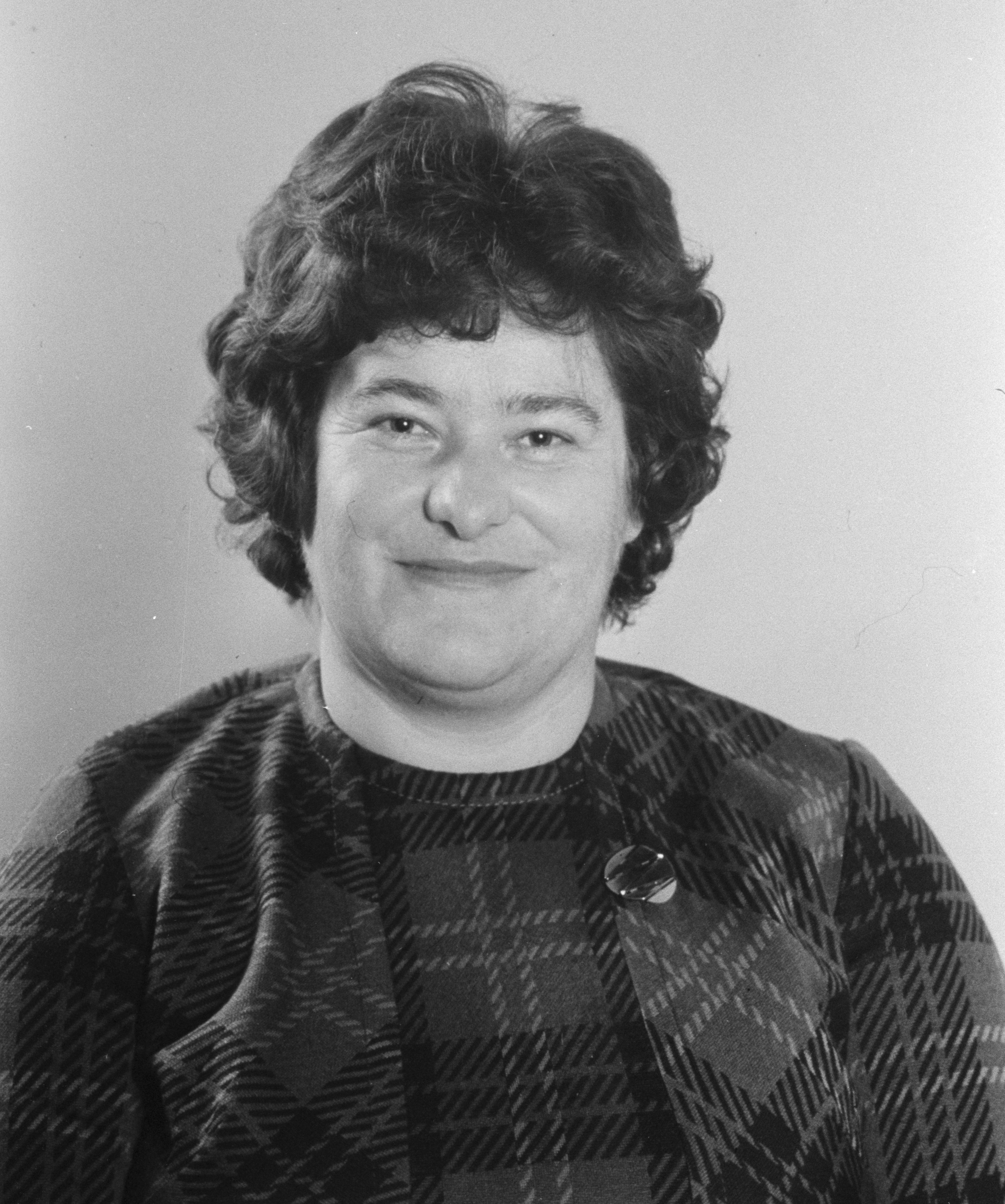
Hedi Lang

Josi Meier

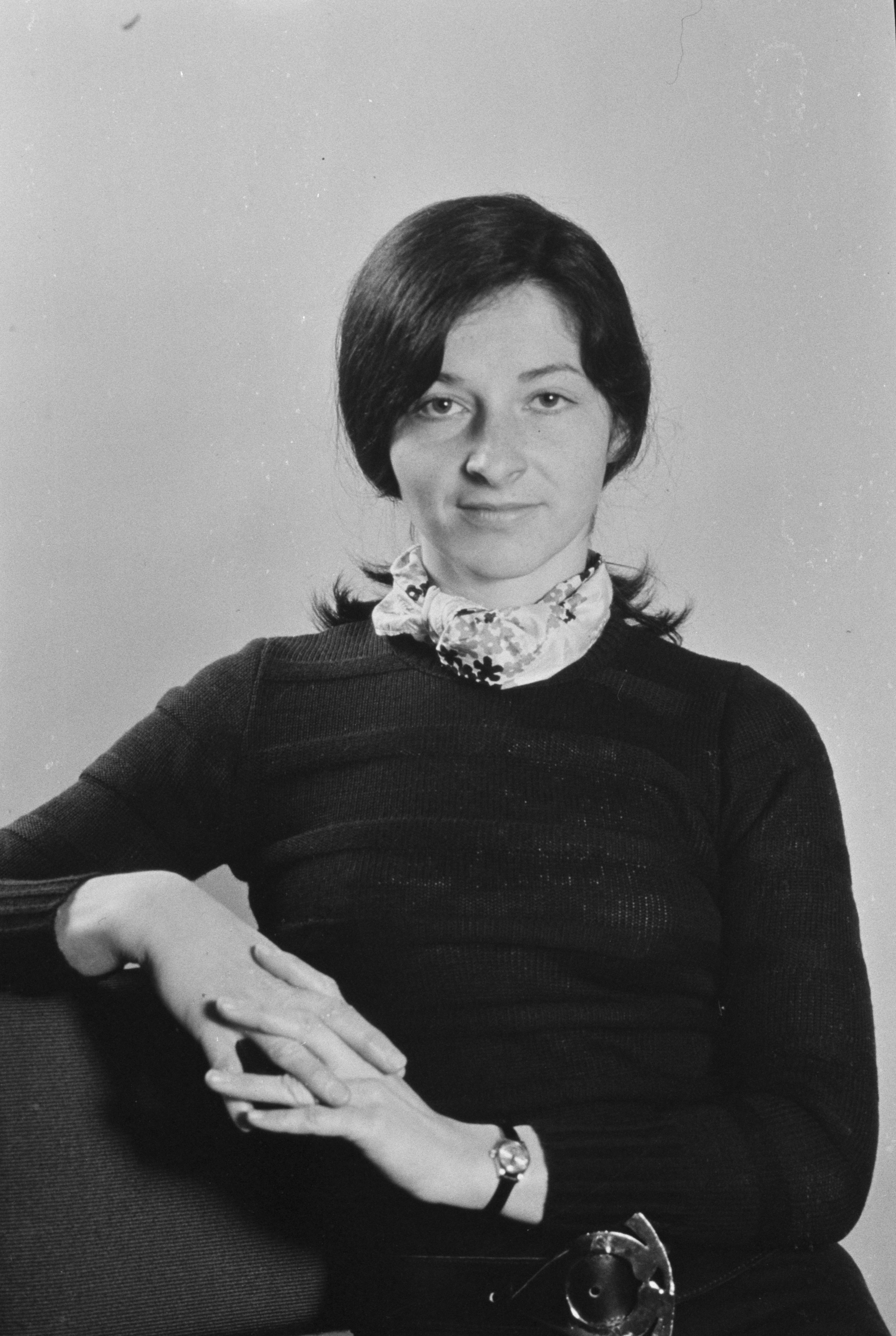
Gabrielle Nanchen

Martha Ribi

Hanna Sahlfeld

Liselotte Spreng

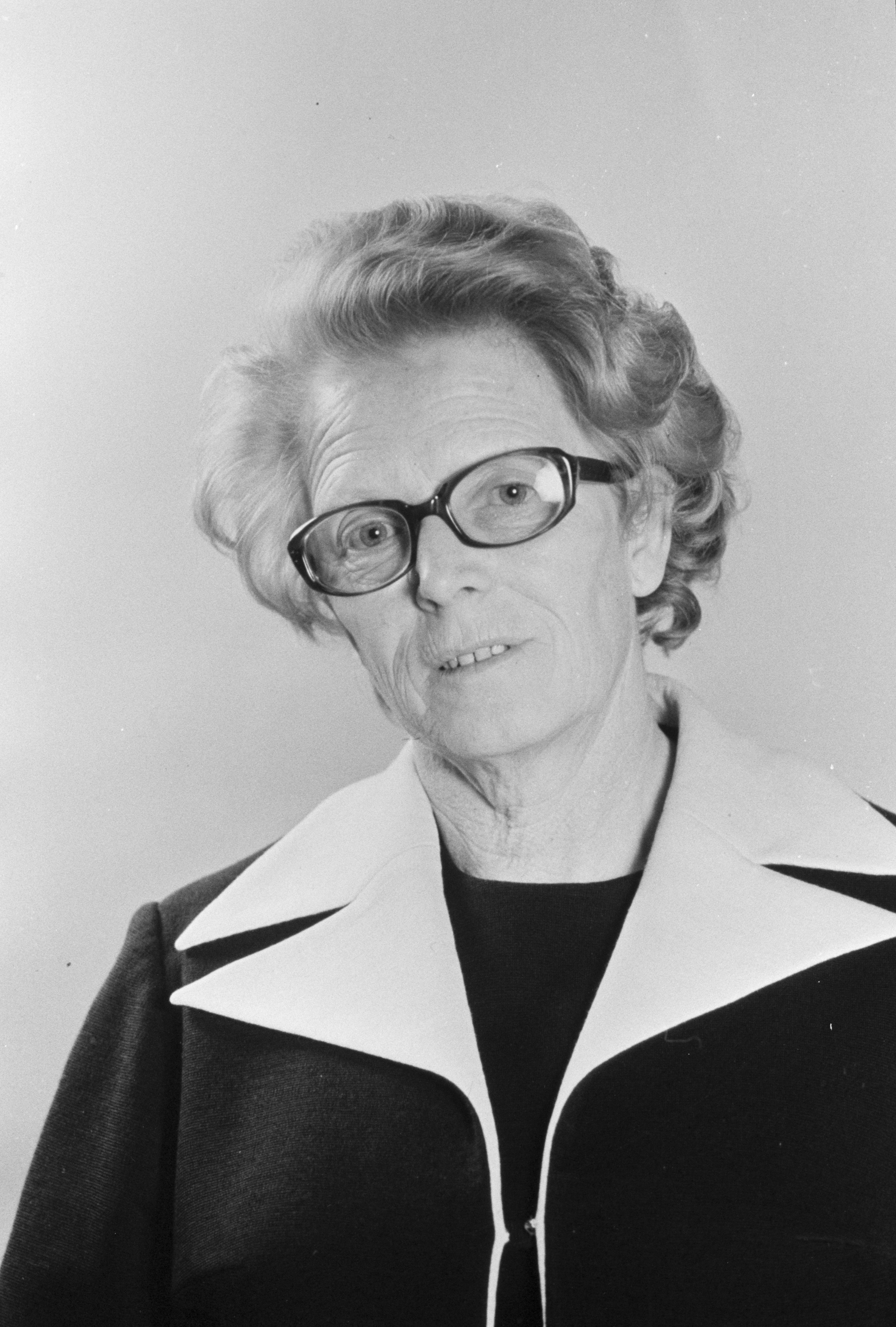
Hanny Thalmann

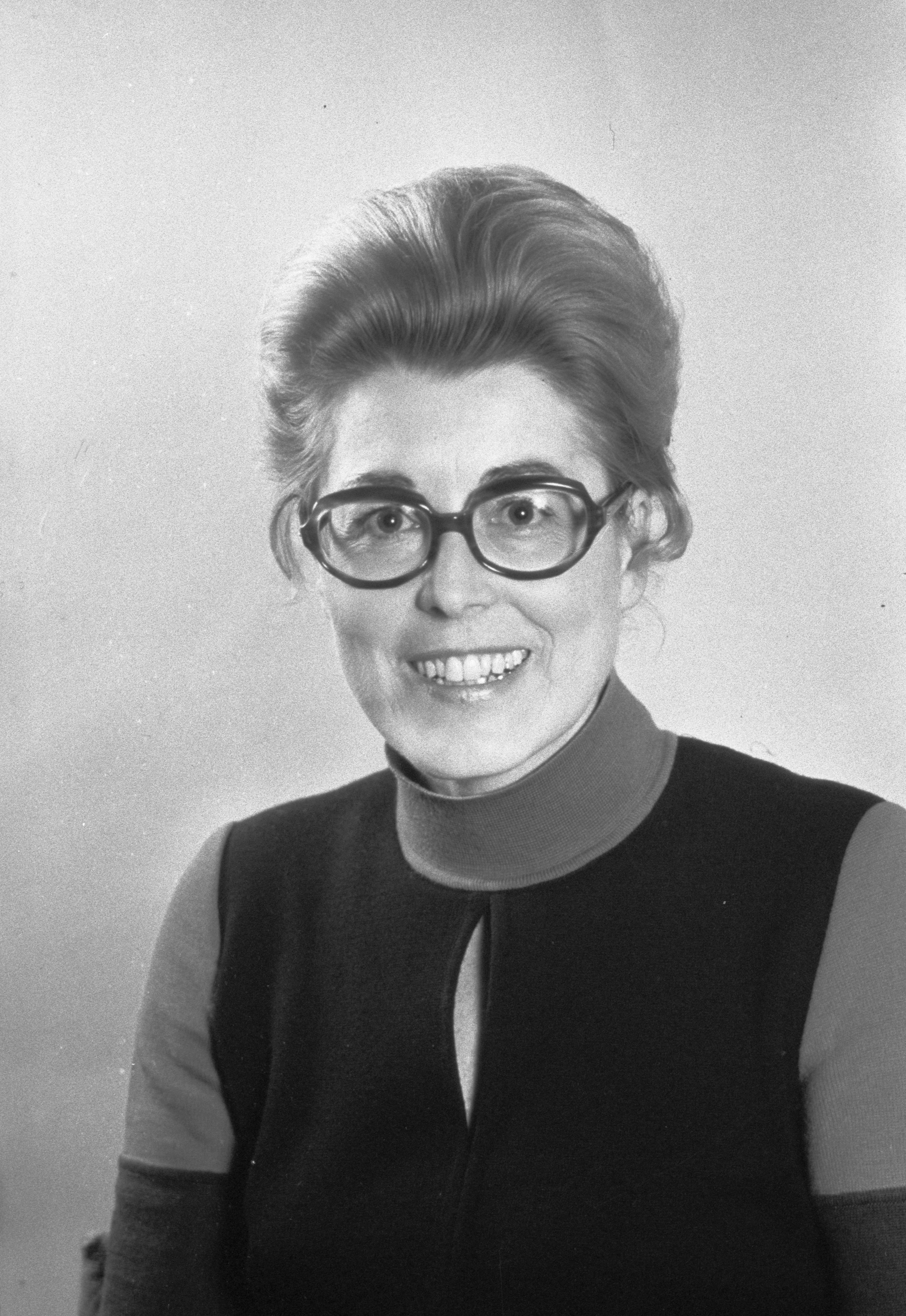
Lilian Uchtenhagen

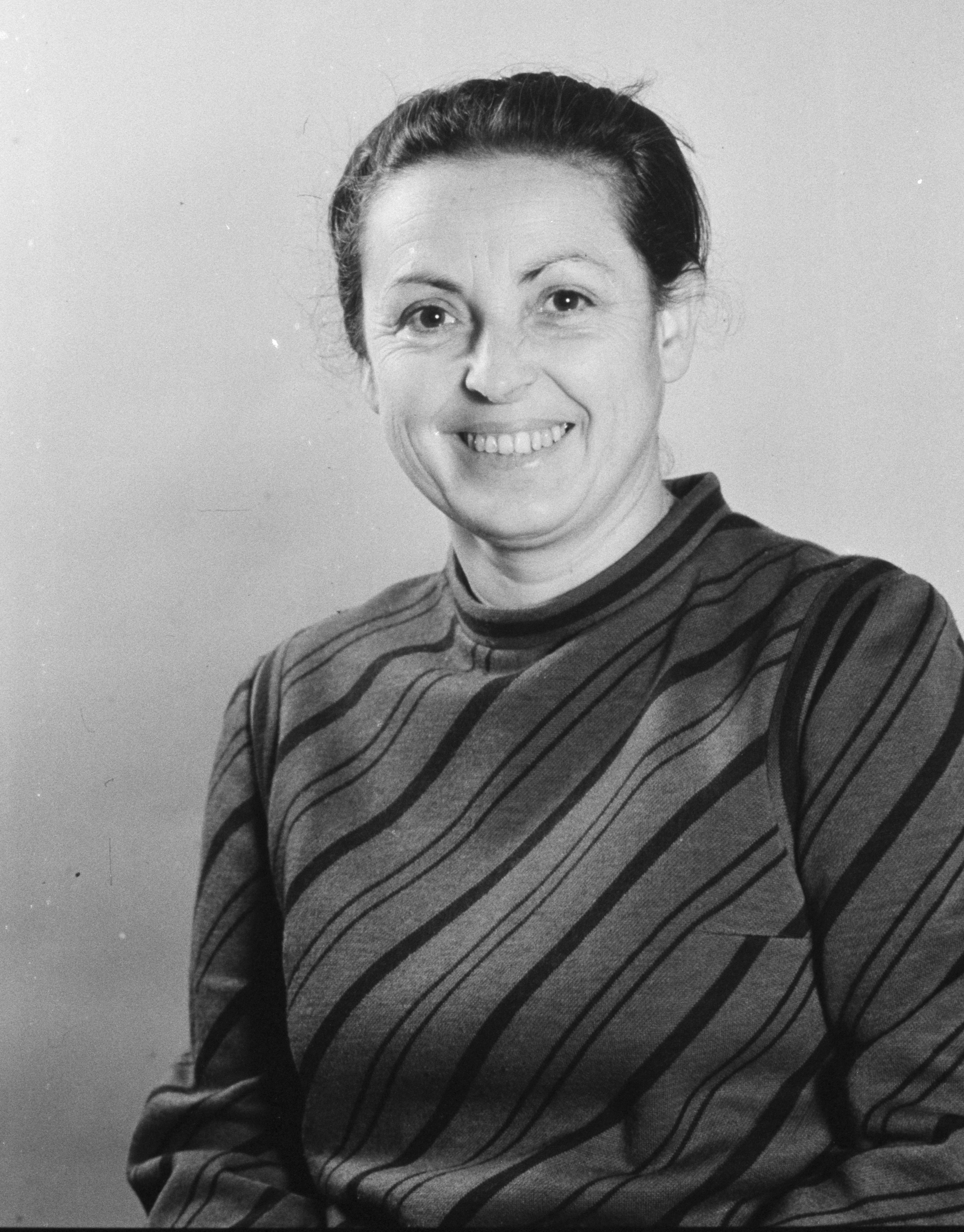
Nelly Wicky

Lise Girardin (Councillor of State)

=== Federal Council ===
The first female member of the seven-member Swiss Federal Council, Elisabeth Kopp, served from 1984 to 1989.

Ruth Dreifuss, the second female member, served from 1993 to 1999, and was the first female President of the Swiss Confederation for the year 1999.

Two women, Micheline Calmy-Rey and Ruth Metzler-Arnold, served on the Swiss Federal Council from 1999 to 2003; when Ruth Metzler-Arnold failed to be re-elected in 2003, the number fell back to one. With the election of Doris Leuthard in 2006, there were again two, and, after January 2008, three with the arrival of Eveline Widmer Schlumpf. Micheline Calmy-Rey was elected President of the Swiss Confederation for 2007 and 2011.

On 22 September 2010, the Federal Council changed to a female majority for two years with the addition of Simonetta Sommaruga. Doris Leuthard was elected President for the years 2010 and 2017, and Eveline Widmer Schlumpf for the year 2012, Simonetta Sommaruga for the year 2015. The female representation dropped back to three in 2012, and further down to two women in 2016.

Since 2019 there are three female members of the Federal Council: Simonetta Sommaruga (elected in 2010), Viola Amherd (since 2019) and Karin Keller-Sutter (since 2019).

=== Cantonal level ===
As of 2018, 37 women serve on cantonal executives (24% of a total of 154); 722 serve as representatives in cantonal parliaments (27.7% of 2609).

=== Municipal level ===
As of 2017, 277 women serve in town executives (26% of 789); 1,598 serve as representatives in town parliaments (31.3% of 3,508).

Lise Girardin was in 1968 the first female mayor of a Swiss city, Geneva, and also served as the first female Councillor of States (1971–1975).

Corine Mauch (member of the Social Democratic Party) presides the largest Swiss city Zürich as its mayor since 2009. As of 4 March 2018 she has been re-elected in first round as Stadtpräsidentin for another 4 years. She is openly gay and lives in a relationship.

== Chronology ==
=== Constitution of 1848 ===
The constitution of 1848, the origin of modern Switzerland, proclaims the equality in the eyes of the law of all human beings (in German, Menschen) but does not explicitly include women in that equality. However, the laws that followed that constitution rigidly placed women in a situation of legal inferiority.

=== Debate over women's rights: 1860–1887 ===
From 1860 to 1874, the first feminist movements were organized and, contemporaneously, the first constitutional revision of 1874; the political rights of women became the object of numerous discussions. In 1886, a first petition from a group of eminent women led by Marie Goegg-Pouchoulin was presented to the Federal Assembly. The attention attracted by this initiative opened the way for the first article about the claims of women in a large daily, Ketzerische Neujahrsgedanken einer Frau (Heretical New Years' Thoughts of a Woman), by Meta von Salis published in 1887 by the Zürcher Post. In the same year, Emilie Kempin-Spyri demanded before the federal court the right to become a lawyer. Her request was refused.

=== Women's rights organizations: 1893–1898 ===
In 1893, Frauenkomitee Bern was founded in Bern, and women in Zurich founded the Union fuer Frauenbestrebungen (Union for Women's Endeavors), which focused on women's rights. In 1894, von Salis organized meetings in the principal cities of Switzerland on the theme of the right to vote for women. Her conferences had little success and she often had to confront numerous demonstrations of hostility. Two years later, in 1896, the first congress of Swiss women was held in Geneva. Numerous male speakers called for an alliance between men and women, and, at the same time, for moderation in the demands. The importance that these demands acquired in the public debate led to the creation of the first parliamentary commission for the "woman question."

=== Advances and resistance: 1900–1959 ===
Around the turn of the 20th century, women organized in the entire country, and formed various women's organizations, for, as well as against, women's suffrage. The two most important were the Confederation of Swiss Women's Associations (Bund Schweizerischer Frauenvereine (BSF), since 1999 known as alliance F), under the leadership of Helene von Mülinen, and the Swiss Alliance for Women's Suffrage (Schweizerischer Verband für Frauenstimmrecht (SVF)), which was founded in 1909.

During the First World War, the movement came to a halt, as more critical problems came to the forefront. Among others, the women's alliances carried out the collective welfare work during the war, since Switzerland at this time still had no social insurance.

In the 1918 Swiss general strike, women's suffrage was the second of nine demands. In December, the first two advances for women's suffrage at the federal level were made by the National Councillors Herman Greulich (SP) and Emil Göttisheim (FDP). In two motions, the Federal Council was called upon to "introduce a report and motion regarding the constitutional granting of the same voting rights and eligibility for election to female Swiss citizens as to male Swiss citizens".

Half a year later, in June 1919, 158 women's associations prepared a petition to grant more importance to the two motions. As a result, the motions of Greulich and Göttisheim were accepted by the National Council and taken over by the Federal Council for completion. However, the responsible Federal Councillor, Heinrich Häberlin (FDP), postponed the action, due to "urgent problems." Fifteen years later, in 1934, Häberlin handed over the unfinished business to his successor with the instruction, "The material for women's suffrage lies in the middle drawer to the right of your desk."

In 1923, a group of women from Bern prepared a constitutional complaint. They wanted to exercise their voting rights in community, cantonal, and federal matters; however, they were rejected by the federal court by reference to customary law (Gewohnheitsrecht).

Five years later, Leonard Jenni applied to the Federal Council with a petition demonstrating that the concept of "Stimmbürger" (elector) in the German language included both sexes. The petition was rejected on the following grounds:

"When one now asserts that the concept is also supposed to include Swiss women, then one oversteps the boundaries of the allowable interpretation and thereby commits an act that contradicts the sense of the constitution..."

In the summer of the same year, the Swiss Exhibition for Women's Work (Schweizerische Ausstellung für Frauenarbeit (SAFFA)) took place. A memorable vehicle accompanied the procession; a snail named "women's suffrage." The organizers were strongly criticized for the snail and some critics saw this entirely as a sign of the political immaturity of the women.

In 1929, the SVF launched a new petition for women's suffrage and this time achieved a record number of signatures that even exceeded the required number of signatures for a popular initiative: 170,397 signatures of women and 78,840 signatures of men. The Catholic Women's League (Katholische Frauenbund) distanced itself explicitly from the demands of the other women's associations. Other oppositional organizations reacted as well and, in 1931, the Swiss League Against Political Women's Suffrage (Schweizer Liga gegen das politische Frauenstimmrecht) brought a petition to the Federal Council titled "Position Against the Politicization of Swiss Women." On many occasions, the women and men of the League, among them Emma Rufer, wrote to the Federal Council and the parliament and implored them to abandon the project.

During the 1930s and early 1940s, the effort for women's suffrage was once again overshadowed by international events such as the economic crisis and the Second World War. Women were called upon many times during these years to "protect democracy", to which the women's alliances advocating voting rights responded that in order to do that they needed to have democratic rights at their disposal.

Near the end of the Second World War, the question arose again; in particular, middle-class women, in a counter-move to their entry in the military Women's Support Service (Frauenhilfsdienst), demanded that they be granted their democratic rights. In 1944, National Councillor Emil Oprecht requested in a postulate the introduction of women's suffrage, because important women's political issues were close to the political agenda of the day: old age and survivors' insurance, motherhood insurance, and family protection. The postulate was supported by the BSF with a petition of 6 February 1945 in the name of 38 women's alliances. The Swiss Women's Association for the Public Good (Schweizerische Gemeinnützige Frauenverein) did not express an opinion on the question; however, the Catholic Women's League (Katholische Frauenbund) departed from the conservative line of the Catholic church and gave its members a free voice. In 1945, the Swiss Action Committee for Women's Suffrage (Schweizerische Aktionskomitee für Frauenstimmrecht) was established as an opinion-forming instrument.

In 1948, celebrations of the one hundred-year existence of the federal constitution were carried out, and "Switzerland, a people of brothers", celebrated. The women's associations rephrased the motto as "a people of brothers without sisters", and symbolically presented the Federal Council a map of Europe with a black blot in the middle. At this time, all European countries, with the exception of Switzerland, Portugal and Liechtenstein, had established women's suffrage. Like the SAFFA snail previously, this symbolic map was interpreted by critics as a sign of the political immaturity of the women.

In 1950, the Federal Council put a report before the Federal Assembly about the procedure for coming to an agreement for the establishment of women's voting rights. In 1951, the Swiss Women's Circle Against Women's Voting Rights (Schweizerische Frauenkreis gegen das Frauenstimmrecht), under the leadership of Dora Wipf, wrote a letter to the Federal Council that said: "[...]We do not believe that our country requires politicized women[...]"

A year later, in 1952, Antoinette Quinche, president of the Swiss Women's Circle for Women's Voting Rights, and 1414 other disputants from her community, demanded to be entered into the voters' register. With the argument that the cantonal constitution at that time did not explicitly exclude women's voting rights, they went with their demand before the Federal Court. Again as in 1923, they were rejected by reference to customary law.

In 1957 a plebiscite was held, by which the civil defense service (Zivilschutzdienst) became mandatory for all Swiss women. During the plebiscite, a scandal took place. Encouraged by the community council, the women of the Unterbäch community of the canton Valais (Wallis) voted. The community council explained that according to the terms of the constitution, the community is legally authorized to set up the voting register.

Community president and chief councillor Paul Zenhäusern and the Valais (Wallis) National Councillor Peter von Roten were the initiators of the women's vote. 33 of the 84 potentially eligible Unterbäch women took part; Katharina Zenhäusern, wife of the community president of Unterbäch, was the first Swiss woman who placed a ballot in a Swiss ballot box. The women's votes, that were collected in a separate ballot box (the men's votes thus remained valid) had to be annulled, because the women's participation at that time still had no legal basis. Nevertheless, these first national women's votes wrote Swiss history, because they gave an important push for the later official establishment of women's suffrage. Thus Unterbäch was the first community in Switzerland to establish the communal voting and election rights for women – in spite of the ban by the Valais (Wallis) executive council.

After the canton of Basel-City empowered the three city communities to establish women's suffrage in 1957, the community of Riehen was the first in Switzerland to introduce women's suffrage on 26 June 1958. In the same year, Gertrud Späth-Schweizer was in the city council and therefore became the first Swiss woman elected to a governing body.

In 1958, the Federal parliament voted for the first time for a referendum on the establishment of women's suffrage for national issues; the proposal was accepted in the National Council with 96 to 43 votes, and in the Council of States with 25 to 12 votes.

On 1 February 1959, the first people's vote on national women's suffrage decisively failed with a voter participation of 67 percent in the people's vote (33% to 66%) and cantonal vote (3 to 16 plus 6 half cantons). Protest actions and women's strikes followed in all of Switzerland. Only in the cantons of Vaud, Neuchâtel, and canton of Geneva did a majority speak for women's suffrage.

The proponents, however, were able to record their first success at the cantonal level. On 1 February 1959, the canton of Vaud accepted women's suffrage. The cantons of Neuchâtel (27 September 1959) and Geneva (6 March 1960) followed, as well as the German-speaking cantons of Basel-City (26 June 1966), and canton of Basel-Country (23 June 1968). Likewise, before the establishment of a national women's suffrage, the cantons of Ticino (19 October 1969), Valais (Wallis) (12 April 1970), and Zürich (15 November 1970) gave voting and election rights to women at the cantonal level.

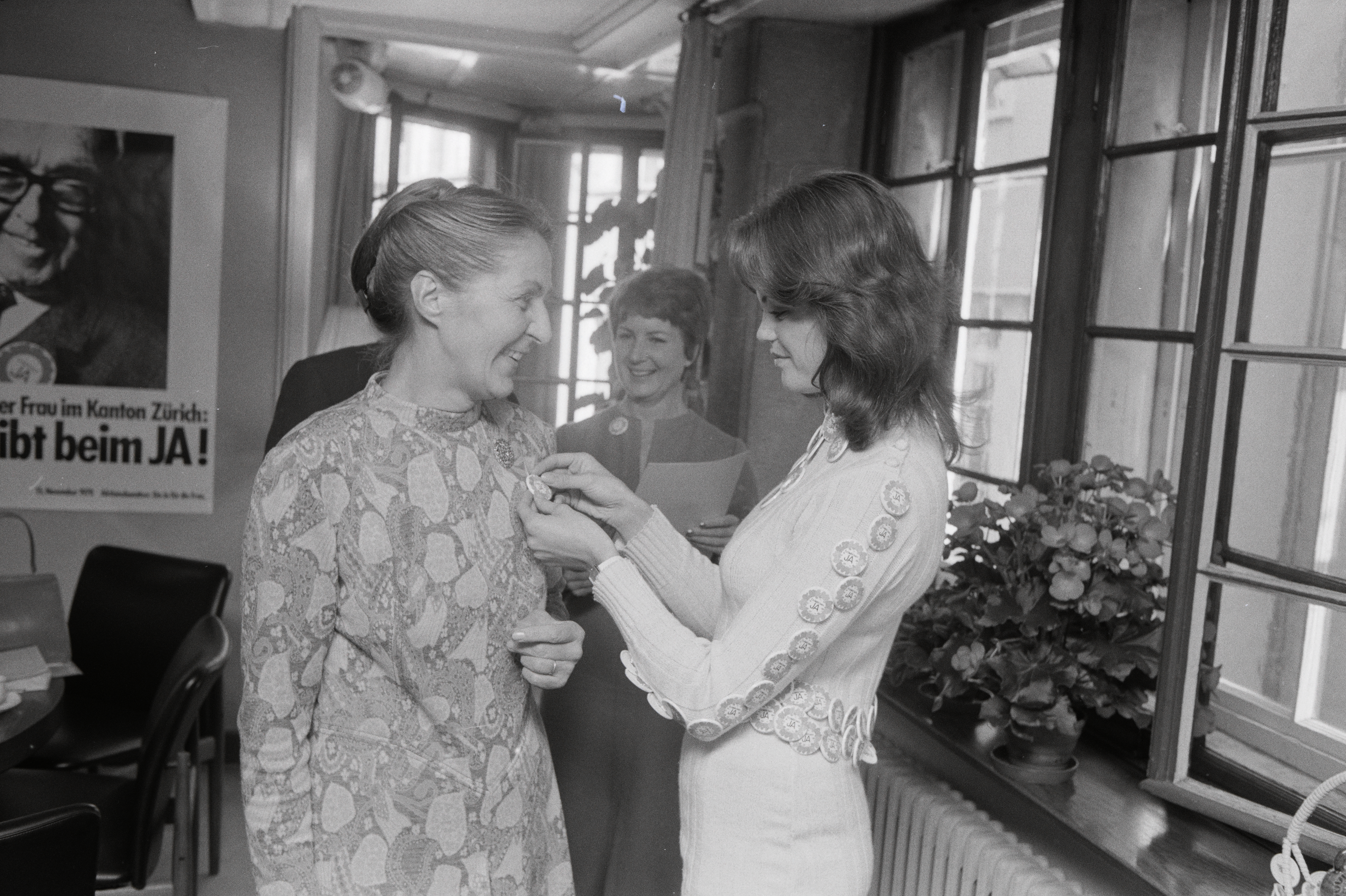
Women's voting rights campaign, 1970

=== Extension to the cantonal level: 1960–1990 ===
In the end of 1970, 9 out of 25 cantons had introduced women's suffrage at the cantonal level. From 1970 to 1990, this right was extended to other cantons. In a judgment of 27 November 1990 in the case of Theresa Rohner et consorts contre Appenzell Rhodes-Intérieures (ATF 116 Ia 359), the Swiss federal court declared unconstitutional the exclusive male suffrage as had been practiced in the half canton of Appenzell Innerrhoden. The principle of equality between men and women as was guaranteed by the federal constitution ordered, in effect, an interpretation of the Appenzell constitution such that women's suffrage should be equally possible. The voters of the canton had stood against women's suffrage in 1959 by 2,050 votes to 105.

== Introduction of women's suffrage at the cantonal level ==
Date	Canton
1 February 1959	Vaud
27 September 1959	Neuchâtel
6 March 1960	Geneva
26 June 1966	Basel-Stadt
23 June 1968	Basel-Landschaft
19 October 1969	Ticino
12 April 1970	Valais
25 October 1970	Lucerne
15 November 1970	Zürich
7 February 1971	Aargau, Fribourg, Schaffhausen and Zug
2 May 1971	Glarus
6 June 1971	Solothurn
12 December 1971	Bern, Thurgau
23 January 1972	St. Gallen
30 January 1972	Uri
5 March 1972	Schwyz and Graubünden
30 April 1972	Nidwalden
24 September 1972	Obwalden
30 April 1989	Appenzell Ausserrhoden
27 November 1990	Appenzell Innerrhoden (by decision of the Federal Supreme Court of Switzerland)
The Jura, created by secession from Bern on 23 June 1979, has always had women's suffrage.

== See also ==
- Women in Switzerland
- Women's suffrage
- List of Swiss suffragists and suffragettes
- List of suffragists and suffragettes
- List of women's rights activists
- Timeline of women's suffrage
- Alliance F
- The Divine Order
