= Pauline Kergomard =

French educator (1838–1925)

- Pauline Kergomard with her small children
- Born: Pauline Reclus; April 24, 1838; Bordeaux, France
- Died: 13 February 1925; Saint-Maurice, Val-de-Marne, France
- Occupation: Educator
- Known for: Founder of the nursery school in France
- Spouse: Gustave de Penmarch
- Family: Reclus family

Pauline Kergomard (née Reclus, 24 April 1838 – 13 February 1925) was a French educator. She is known as the founder of the nursery school in France.

== Early years ==
Pauline Reclus was born in Bordeaux in 1838. Her father was Jean Reclus, inspector of schools of the Gironde. Her uncle, Jacques Reclus, taught at the Protestant college of Sainte-Foy-la-Grande. She spent her infancy with her aunt Zéline in Orthez. On returning to Bordeaux, she was a student at a secular institution that became the École normale of Gironde. She became a public school teacher in the Gironde. She married Jules Duplessis-Kergomard, a penniless man of letters with little interest in working.

== Career ==
In 1879, Pauline Kergomard was appointed general delegate for inspection of asylums, with the support of Ferdinand Buisson. She was named to the post by Jules Ferry. She was inspector-general of kindergartens from 1881 until 1917. She was extremely active, attending conferences, dealing with regional and national authorities, and campaigning against child poverty and for women's causes. She traveled throughout France, inspecting schools and communicating her educational philosophy based on respect for the child and the search for fulfillment.

Pauline Kergomard and Charles Defodon co-edited the Ami de l'enfance, the organ of the French maternal educational system. In 1884, the French Chamber's budget commission considered eliminating all nursery school Inspectress Generals. The L'Ami de l'enfance raised the alarm. Defodon praised the inspectorate as a French tradition that made use of women's distinctive maternal talents. Caroline de Barrau noted that nursery schools had been founded as an initiative of women which the state then chose to support. She disparaged the regime by comparison to its predecessors, who had introduced inspectress generals. The unsatisfactory compromise was to dismiss or retire four of the inspectresses and retain the other four.

From 1886 to 1892, Kergomard was a member of the higher council of public education. Her work led to reform of asylums and the creation of kindergartens with a completely new and secular system of education. She attended the 1896 International Feminist Congress in Paris, presided over by Marie Bonnevial, which discussed coeducation. The Prévost orphanage, the first mixed school in France, received much attention. She and Léopold Lacour were able to get an agreement on the final resolution in favor of changing to a coeducational system in all countries. In 1897, she co-founded the "People's Union" with Ferdinand Buisson, Maurice Bouchor, Émile Duclaux and Théodore Steeg.

== Legacy ==
In France, as of 2015, 113 educational institutions are named after Kergomard, many of them kindergartens.

There are streets bearing her name at Bordeaux, Paris, Lyon and Dijon, in Ducos (Martinique) and in Casablanca.

A 1.70F commemorative stamp was issued March 8, 1985, International Women's Day.

== See also ==
- Nursery Schools of France

== Bibliography ==
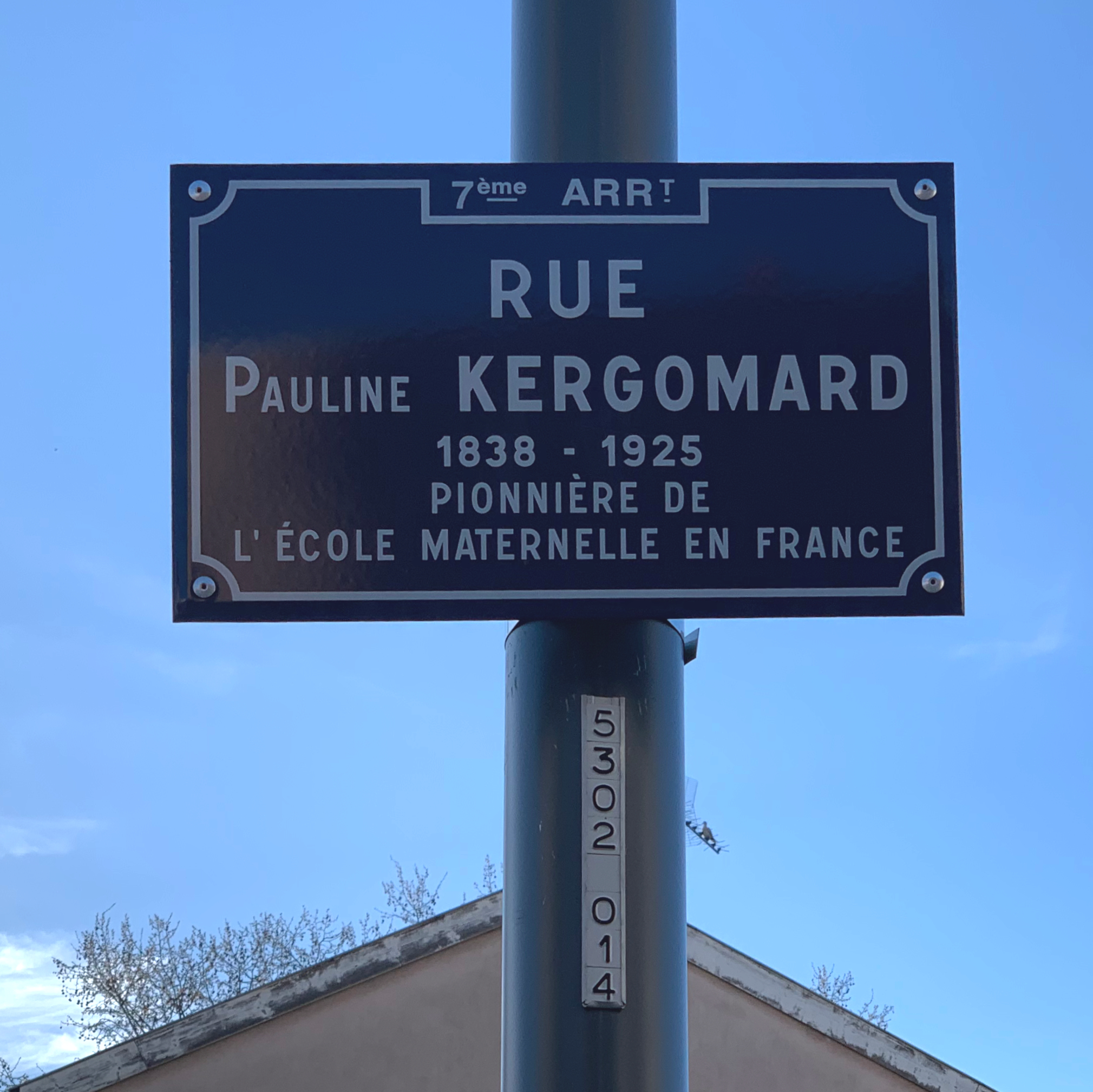
A street sign in Lyon which commemorates her

- Galerie enfantine des hommes illustres (1879)
- Les Biens de la terre, causeries enfantines (1879)
- L'Amiral Coligny (1881)
- Nouvelles enfantines (1881)
- Une brouille de peu de durée. Les Convives de Gabrielle. Fileuse et couseuse (1883)
- Histoire de France des petits enfants (1883)
- L'Éducation maternelle dans l'école (1886)
- Cinquante images expliquées (album pour les enfants, 1890)
- L'Éducation maternelle dans l'école, deuxième série (1895)
- Heureuse rencontre (1895)
- Les Écoles maternelles, décrets, règlements et circulaires en vigueur (1905)
- Les Écoles maternelles de 1837 jusqu'en 1910, aperçu rapide (1910)
- L'Enfant de deux à six ans
