= Paul Gibier =

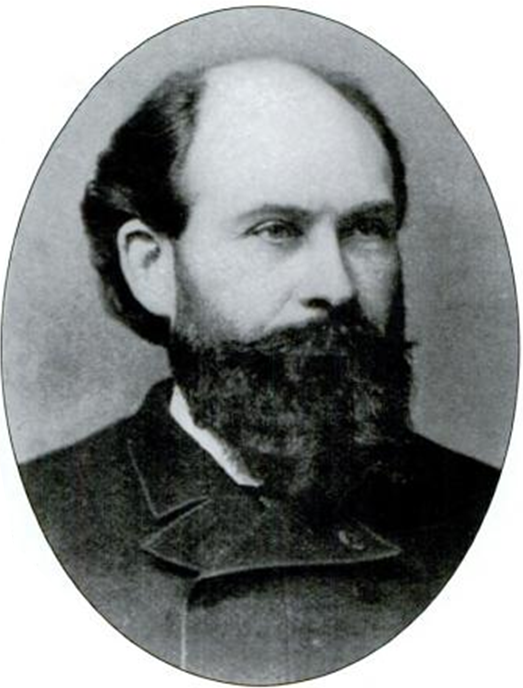
- Born: October 9, 1851; France
- Died: June 23, 1900 (aged 48)
- Occupation: Doctor
- Known for: Spiritualism

Paul Gibier (October 9, 1851 – June 23, 1900) was a French medical doctor, bacteriologist, and researcher of contagious diseases who founded the New York Pasteur Institute. This pioneering private research laboratory was concerned with developing biomedical cures, including vaccines and antitoxins. He was also known for his interest in psychic phenomena.

== Early years ==
Paul Gibier was born in France in 1851. He worked in a machine shop, served in the French cavalry in Africa and worked as a clerk for a railway company. He then attended the University of Paris, where he obtained a degree in medicine. His doctoral thesis of 1884 was on rabies in animals and was supervised by one of Louis Pasteur's friends. Soon after he graduated, the French government sent him to Germany to investigate "the organization of laboratories for medical research." Gibier received a gold medal for his investigations into an outbreak of cholera in Spain and was made a Chevalier of the Legion of Honour for his work on cholera in the south of France.

In Paris, Gibier formed a circle of people interested in Spiritualism, which included Caroline de Barrau. In 1887, Gibier published Le spiritisme (fakirisme occidental), a critical and experimental study that included discussion of mediums, North American Indians and Hindu Fakirs. In this book, in which he claimed to be scientifically impartial and reported experiments objectively, he indulged in violently anti-Catholic views. In 1889, Gibier published his Physiologie transcendantale: Analyse des choses in which he described his research into psychological physiology, including careful studies of hypnotism, telepathy, duplication and so on.

The French government sent Gibier to study yellow fever in Florida and Havana. He hoped to find the yellow fever microbe reported by Dr. Domingos José Freire of the Rio de Janeiro faculty of medicine. He reached Havana in November 1887, but could not find the micro-organisms in the blood of victims that Freire reported. Gibier did find a bacillus in the intestine of a victim that seemed a possible cause of the disease, but further tests did not confirm this. Due to quarantine regulations, he traveled from Havana to Florida through New York. He settled in New York in 1889.

== New York Pasteur Institute ==
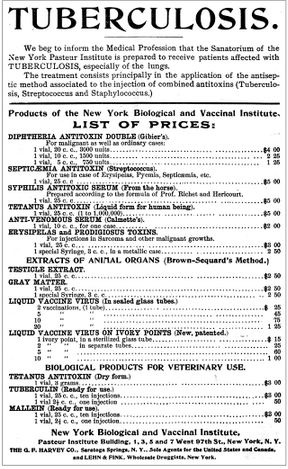
Bulletin of the New York Pasteur Institute (December 1897) full-page ad for medical products

In 1890, Gibier founded the Pasteur Institute in New York for inoculation of people who rabid animals had bitten. The institute, headed by Paul Gibier and Dr. C. Van Schaick as assistant and Dr. A. Liautard as consulting veterinarian, opened on 18 February 1890. In the year that followed, 828 people went for treatment, of whom 643 were found not to be rabid. 185 were inoculated, of whom none died. Those who could not afford to pay were treated for free.

Gibier emerged as a scientific impresario. He could win public interest in laboratory work and gain financial and social support for founding the innovative independent laboratory that could research and develop bio-medical cures. His institute laid the foundation for the modern bio-medical industry. Gibier may have originated the idea of using serotherapy in oncology when in 1893, he submitted the proposition to the Paris Academy of Sciences "to infuse into an animal, the juice of a human tumor and to use the blood or the serum of this animal to infuse in the human harboring this tumor."

Gibier successfully improvised new methods of culturing microbes and producing sera and antitoxins. In October 1893, a new building on Central Park West was formally dedicated, specially built for the institute. In December 1893, Gibier was the subject of a feature article in the New York Times. He joined the New York Academy of Medicine and the Medical Association of New York. In 1895, he bought a 183 acres (74 ha) farm on the Nyack Turnpike, on the outskirts of Suffern, New York. It was about 30 miles (48 km) northwest of New York City. There, he set up a "Pasteur Farm" where he bred animals for research and production of anti-toxins. A large wood and stone frame sanitorium was built in 1898 for patients, particularly those with tuberculosis.

Gibier edited the Therapeutic Review. This quarterly journal, later renamed the Bulletin of the New York Pasteur Institute, included accounts of studies by Gibier and his colleagues, translations of medical articles from French and German, reports on rabies treatments, and advertisements for medical devices and products for practitioners, including antitoxins and serum remedies. His institute was the first in the United States to produce a diphtheria antitoxin.

Writing in the North American Review, Gibier advanced the view that the medical "priest" should lead the movement from "sentimental" to "scientific" religion. He thought that only the doctor could diagnose diseases such as socialism and anarchy, and that with his knowledge of genetics, he could "contribute to the purification of the race" through marriage counseling. In June 1900, Gibier was killed in an accident with a runaway carriage. The Banner of Light said that spiritualism had lost one of its most faithful friends with the transition of Dr. Gibier.

== Works ==
- Gibier, Paul (1883). Les Découvertes récentes sur les Êtres microscopiques et leur application à l'Agriculture.
- Gibier, Paul (1884). Étude sur le choléra d'après un rapport présenté à M. le ministre de l'intérieur sur l'épidémie de 1884 dans l'arrondissement de Brignolis (Var).
- Gibier, Paul (1884). Recherches expérimentales sur la rage et sur son traitement. Parent.
- Gibier, Paul (1887). Le spiritisme (fakirisme occidental).: É́tude historique, critique et expérimentale. O. Doin.
- Gibier, Paul (1890). Physiologie transcendantale: Analyse des choses. Essai sur la science future ... par le Dr. Paul Gibier ... J.-B. Lippincott Company.
- Gibier, Paul (1899). Psychism: Analysis of Things Existing. Essays ... Third Edition (3rd ed.). New York.
- Gibier, Paul (1895). The Physician and the Social Question.
- Gibier, Paul (August 1999). Les matérialisations de fantômes : la pénétration de la matière & autres phénomènes psychiques. R Et C Editeurs Bouchet. ISBN 978-2-922566-06-2.
- Gibier, Paul (26 November 1999). L'étude du spiritisme : historique, critique et expérimentale. R Et C Editeurs Bouchet. ISBN 978-2-922566-11-6.

== Sources ==
- Caillet, Albert Louis (2012-07-08). "GIBIER (Docteur Paul)". Manuel bibliographique des sciences psychiques ou occultes. Cambridge University Press. ISBN 978-1-108-05256-6.
- "Dr. Paul Gibier". British Medical Journal. 2 (2063): 130–131. 1900-07-14. doi:10.1136/bmj.2.2063.130-b. PMC 2463115.
- Guénon, René (2004). The Spiritist Fallacy. Sophia Perennis. ISBN 978-0-900588-72-3.
- Hansen, Bert (2009-05-28). Picturing Medical Progress from Pasteur to Polio: A History of Mass Media Images and Popular Attitudes in America. Rutgers University Press. ISBN 978-0-8135-4859-3.
- Long, Craig H. (2011). Suffern. Arcadia Publishing. ISBN 978-0-7385-7351-9.
- Peters, Austin (1891). Journal of Comparative Medicine and Surgery. W.L. Hyde & Company.
- Sternberg, George M. (1890). "The Bacillus of Dr. Paul Gibier". Researches relating to the Etiology and Prevention of Yellow Fever. U.S. Government Printing Office.
- Thompson, Gary Richard; Lokke, Virgil Llewellyn (1981). Ruined Eden of the Present: Hawthorne, Melville, and Poe : Critical Essays in Honor of Darrel Abel. Purdue University Press. ISBN 978-0-911198-60-7.
- Younes, Anas; Coiffier, Bertrand (2013-05-17). Lymphoma: Diagnosis and Treatment. Springer Science & Business Media. ISBN 978-1-62703-408-1.
