= Hedi Lang =

Swiss politician

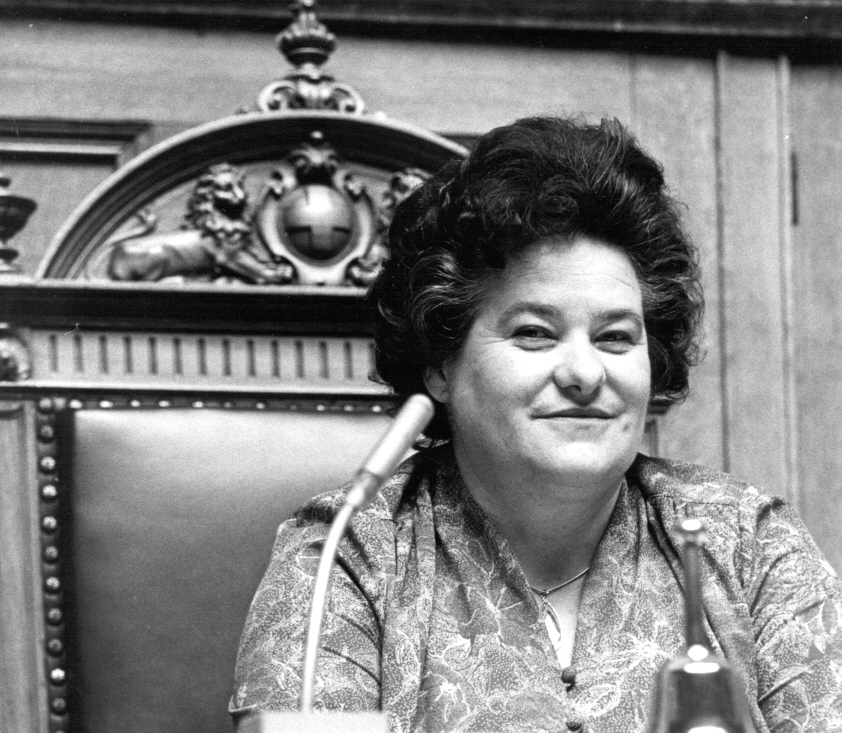

Member of the National Council of Switzerland
- In office 29 November 1971 – 1 June 1983

President of the National Council of Switzerland
- In office 30 November 1981 – 29 November 1982

Executive Council of the Canton of Zürich
- In office 1983–1995

Personal details
- Born: Hedi Gehri; 30 October 1931; Uster, Switzerland
- Died: 31 March 2004 (aged 72); Zollikerberg, Switzerland
- Political party: Social Democratic Party of Switzerland

Hedi Lang (30 October 1931 – 31 March 2004) was a Swiss politician. She was one of the first women to be elected to the Swiss National Council, the first woman elected to a cantonal executive and the second woman to serve as President of the National Council. She was a member of the Social Democratic Party.

== Biography ==
Hedi Lang was born on 30 October 1931 in Uster to Johann Gehri, a cheesemaker from Seedorf, Bern. She married Ernst Lang in 1957 and apprenticed at banks for several years before joining the staff of Die Arbeit, the socialist newspaper where her husband was the editor. In 1961, she joined the Social Democratic Party and in 1970, she was elected to the council of Wetzikon, where she and Ernst moved after their marriage.

In the 1971 Swiss federal election, women were permitted to vote in federal elections for the first time. Lang was elected to the National Council as one of 10 women that year, the first to serve in the Federal Assembly. She rose to become the president of the parliamentary audit committee and, in 1981, became the President of the National Council, the second woman to hold the presidency after Elisabeth Blunschy in 1977.

Lang left the National Council in 1983 and was elected to the Executive Council of Zürich and became the first woman to sit on a cantonal executive council. On the council, she was the Director of Justice and Home Affairs. In 1995, she left the council, having successfully shepherded the work on the expansion of Zurich Airport.

== Personal life ==
Lang married Ernst Lang in 1957. Ernst died in 1973.

Hedi Lang died on 31 March 2004 in Zollikerberg, near Zürich.

Preceded by Laurent Butty	President of the Swiss National Council; 1981/1982	Succeeded by Franz Eng
