= Amand Goegg =

German journalist and revolutionary (1820–1897)

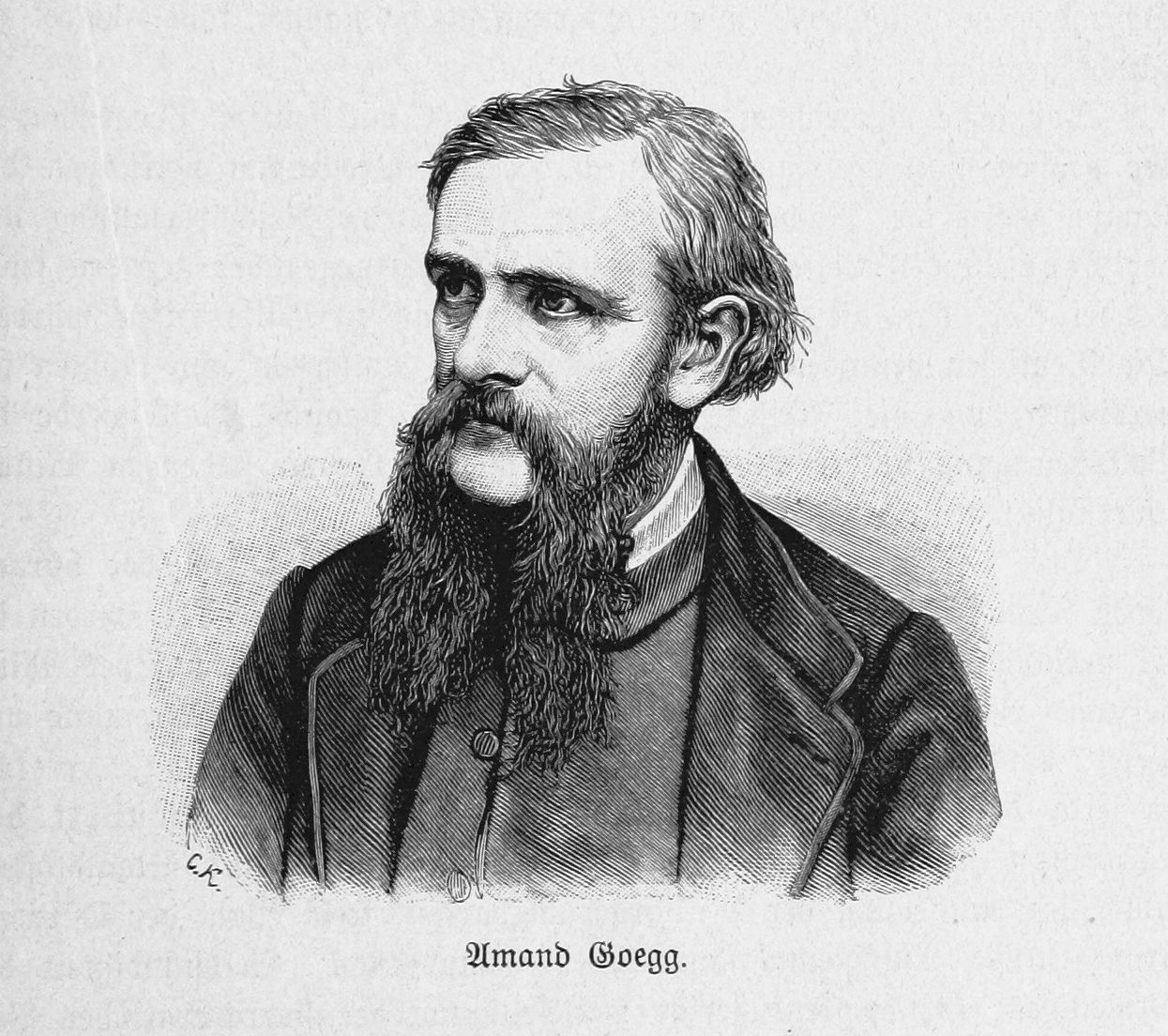
- Born: 1820
- Died: 1897 (aged 76–77)
- Occupation: Journalist

Amand Geogg (1820–1897) was a journalist and a democrat. In 1849, he was a major organizer during the Baden Revolution of 1848-1849. He then served as Finance Minister in Baden's provisional revolutionary government under Lorenzo Brentano. After the revolution was crushed, Geogg fled to the United States for a time. He moved around further, before eventually returning to Germany in 1861 after former revolutionaries were granted amnistey.

Geogg was a member of the First International, and in the 1870s he joined the German Social Democratic Party. Amand Geogg died in 1897.

Goegg was married to the Swiss feminist Marie Goegg-Pouchoulin.
