= Julie von May (von Rued) =

Swiss feminist (1808–1875)

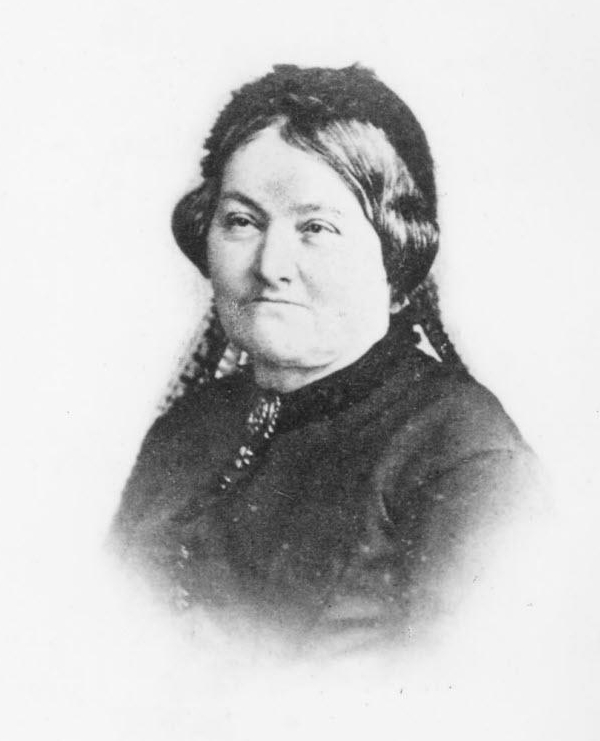
- Julie von May ca.1870
- Born: Julia Carolina Elisabeth May von Belletruche; 26 February 1808; Bern, Switzerland
- Died: 5 March 1875 (aged 67); Bern, Switzerland
- Spouse: Friedrich Amadeus Sigmund von May von Rued

Julie von May (von Rued) (26 February 1808 – 5 March 1875), was a Swiss feminist. In 1868, she became the chairperson of the first women's organisation in Switzerland: Association Internationale des Femmes. She supported women suffrage, but focused on equality before the law. She has been counted as perhaps the leading feminist of her country in her generation alongside Marie Goegg-Pouchoulin.

== Biography ==
Julia Carolina Elisabeth May von Belletruche was born in Bern, the daughter of Karl Rudolf von Belletruche by his marriage to Julia von Steiger. Hers was a leading Bern "establishment family". She married her cousin, Friedrich Amadeus Sigmund von May von Rued (1801-1883) in 1827 and went to live with him at his family home, the Schloss Rued in the Canton of Aargau. Her only daughter, Esther, was born in 1840. In a biographical piece that her daughter wrote about her husband, Friedrich von May is identified as a man who took little account of his wife. She nevertheless undertook secretarial work for him in respect of his own theological and legal essays. After he was badly injured in a riding accident his care needs increased. She also accompanied her husband on his travels.

Julie von May was over 60 in 1869 when she joined the International Women's Association ("Association internationale des femmes" (AIF), a Geneva-based pacifist and feminist organisation. She worked closely with the organisation's de facto leader, Marie Goegg-Pouchoulin. At the AIF general meeting in March 1870 she stressed, in particular, the importance of gender-equality before the law: "... we consider the equality of women and men before the law to be one of the most essential and urgent [rights]". (Note: "nous considérons l'admission de la femme au niveau de l'homme devant la loi comme l'une des plus essentielles et des plus urgentes")

In 1872 she published an essay entitled "Die Frauenfrage in der Schweiz zur Bundesrevision am 12. Mai 1872", which concerned the legal status of women in Switzerland. The same text had already been published in the AIF house journal back in 1870. The article referenced the "Equalities" section in the federal constitution: "All Swiss citizens are equal before the law. In Switzerland there are no covert relationships, no advantages according to place, birth, family or person." (Bundesverfassung 1848, Article 4). The writer appealed to the pride of Switzerland in its status as the cradle of democracy:

"The cradle ... of all European freedoms and equalities, Switzerland holds her daughters in a more dispossessed and enslaved condition than any of the surrounding monarchies. Europe's most mature nation undervalues and infantilises its female part".

She was particularly critical of the way that women were equally burdened – for instance in respect of taxation and the criminal law, but were not accorded the same rights and privileges under the law as men. Julie von May saw this discrimination as the basis of many of the social problems of the time. Women's hands were bound, preventing them from taking care of themselves "through the misery of their social position". She followed this with a catalogue of demands all of which – with the interesting exception of "political equality" – were things for which the Swiss women's movement was battling through till at least 1981: equal education, equal taxation, equal pay for equal work, equal inheritance rights, property rights, equality in marriage and divorce law. When it came to political rights, however, she was able to reassure the men "that we demand no political rights ... so long as we can expect our help from the just dealings of the men".

She knew very well that her demands would only receive a positive response from men if they were backed by massive and sustained pressure from supporters of women's rights. And that was not possible as long as poor educational opportunities meant that women were not in a position to stand up for their legally based rights. She, therefore, came up with proposals for women's associations to be set up in the towns and cities which could explain their legal situation to women. She also called for legal and citizenship instruction to be included in the curricula followed by the girls' schools. The individual city-based women's associations should be grouped together under a federal-level (national) umbrella organisation which would have the political clout to influence federal legislation.

Von May's demands were measured and pragmatic, in contrast to those of her political ally Marie Goegg-Pouchoulin, whose demands can be characterised as "maximalist". The demand that women should simply enjoy enhanced autonomy did not conflict directly with the "dualistic gender images" which were mainstream in Switzerland at the time.

Julie von May suffered a stroke during the latter part of 1874 from which she never fully recovered. She died from the resulting complications early in 1875.
