= Ambros Uchtenhagen =

Swiss psychiatrist (1928–2022)

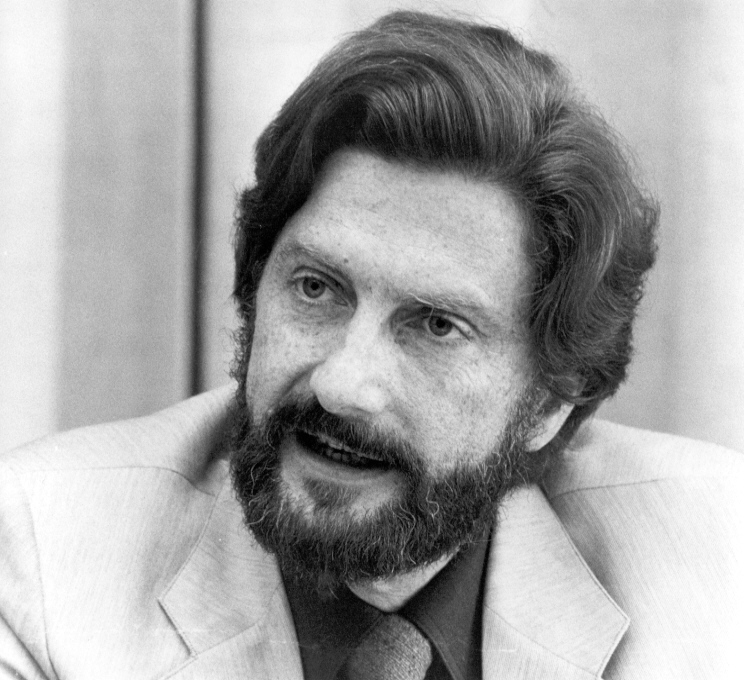
- Born: 23 August 1928
- Died: 10 September 2022 (aged 94)
- Occupation: Psychiatrist

Ambros Uchtenhagen (23 August 1928 - 10 September 2022) was a Swiss psychiatrist. He was the widower of politician Lilian Uchtenhagen, who died in 2016. He served as a professor at the University of Zürich.
