= Lilian Uchtenhagen =

Swiss politician and economist (1928–2016)

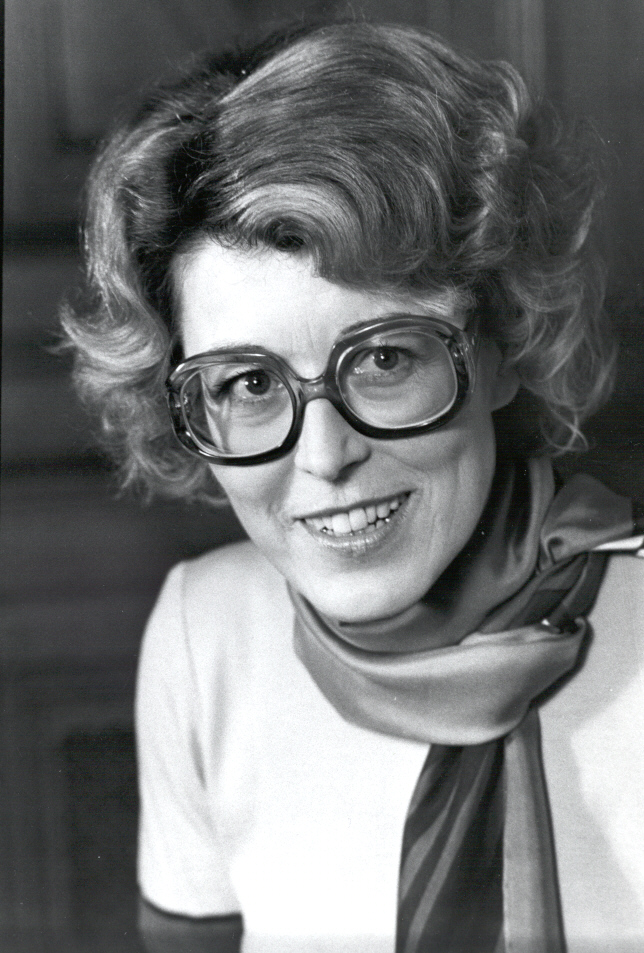
Lilian Uchtenhagen

Lilian Uchtenhagen (7 September 1928 – 6 September 2016) was a Swiss politician and economist. She was one of the ten first women elected to the National Council, the Swiss Parliament's house and first women to be a candidate to the Federal Council, the Government of Switzerland.

== Early life and education ==
Uchtenhagen was born in 1928 at Olten in the Canton of Solothurn, the daughter of a businessman. She studied political science at the University of Basel and at the London School of Economics (LSE) and graduated in 1954 from the University of Basel.

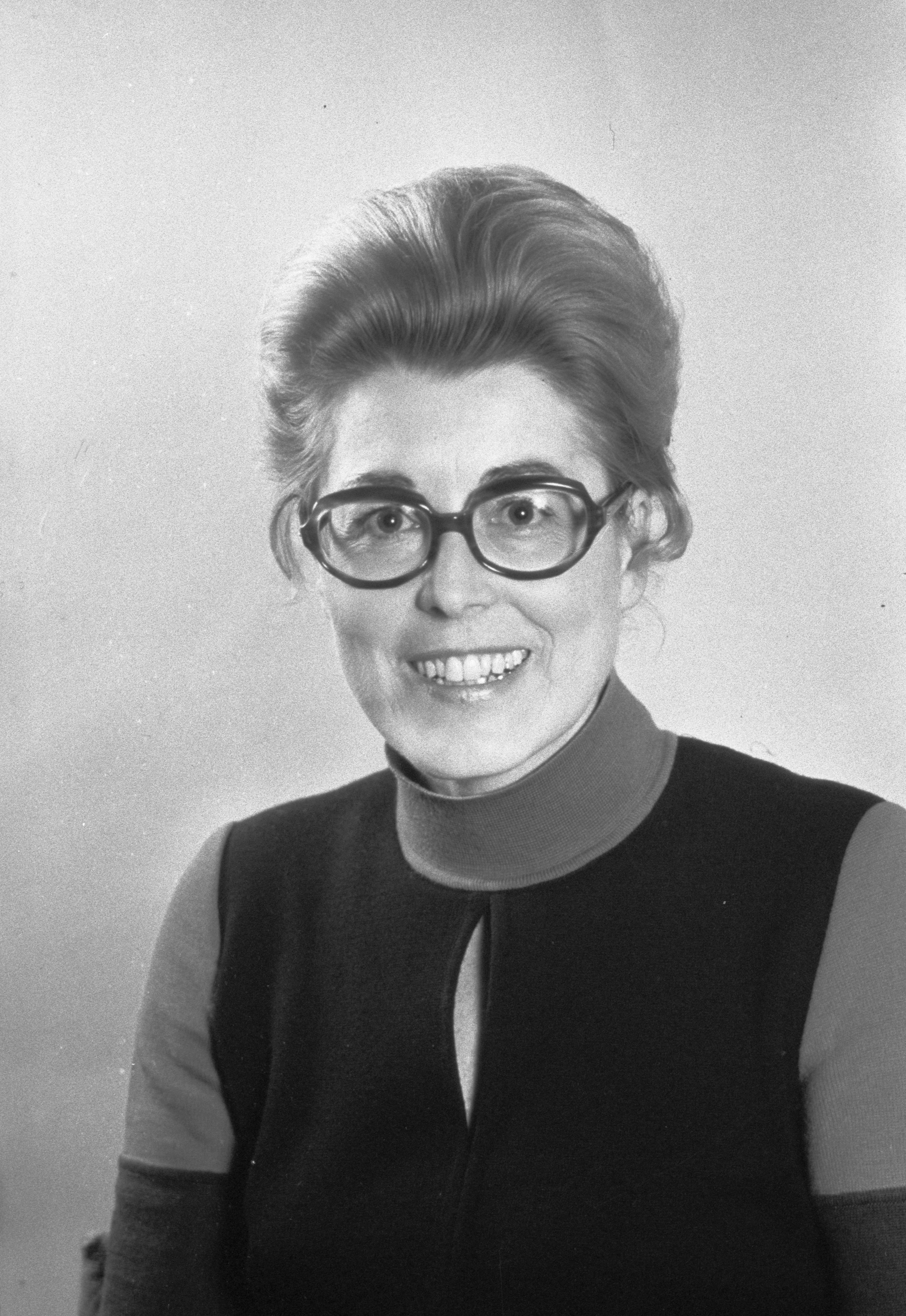
Lilian Uchtenhagen (1971)

== Political career ==
She was elected in to the Municipal Council of Zurich in 1970, from which she resigned in 1974. After women gained the right to vote in national elections in 1971, Uchtenhagen joined the Social Democratic Party (SP), and was one of the first ten women to be elected to the National Council, the Federal Assembly of Switzerland's Lower House. She served in the National Council from 29 November 1971 to 24 November 1991. As the first female candidate in history, she received the nomination from the Social Democratic Party to succeed Willi Ritschard in the Swiss Federal Council in 1983. She lost her bid to Otto Stich also from her party; but supported by the rivaling conservative parties. The TIME magazine article "Ladies Last" states that she lost her bid because of male reluctance to allow for a woman to serve on the council.

=== Professional career ===
Lilian Uchtenhagen served as the president of Zürich's Coop retail chain from 1981 to 1997, and was president of the charitable organization Swissaid from 1998 to 2003.

== Personal life ==
A resident of the Canton of Zürich and the wife of Ambros Uchtenhagen, a Swiss psychiatrist credited with the initiating of the establishment of the national drug policy. Uchtenhagen died on 6 September 2016, the eve of her 88th birthday.
