= Association internationale des femmes =

Swiss Feminist organization

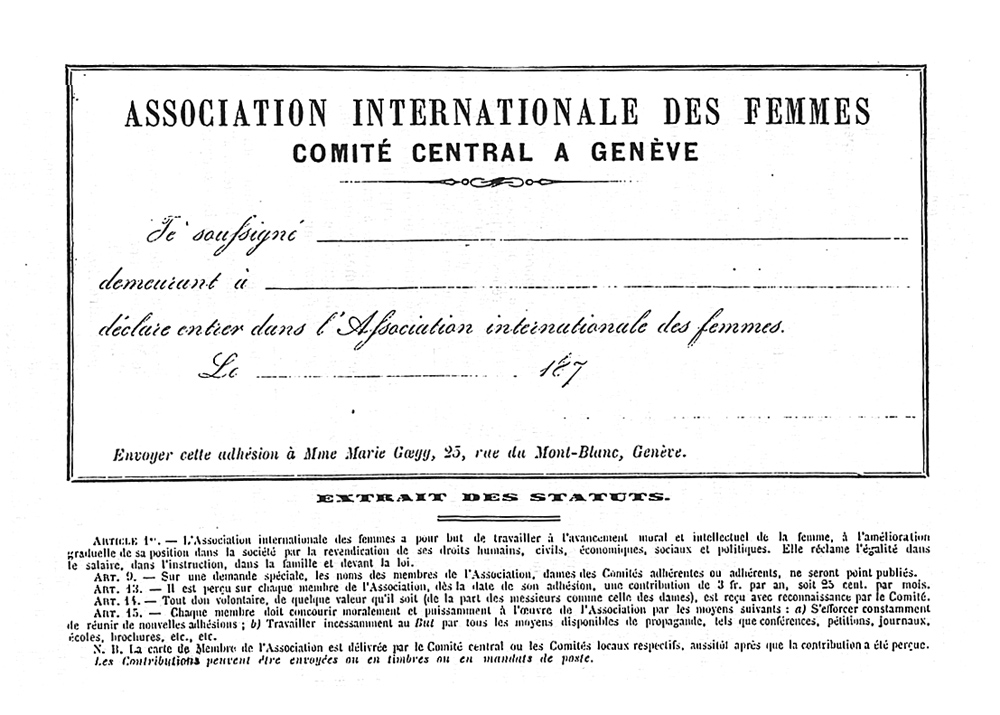
- Membership application form with extract of the AIF statutes
- Successor: Association pour la défense des droits de la femme
- Formation: 1868
- Dissolved: 1872
- Type: Association
- Purpose: Women's rights
- Headquarters: Geneva, Switzerland
- Founder: Marie Goegg-Pouchoulin

The Association internationale des femmes (AIF; International Association of Women) was a short-lived feminist and pacifist organization based in Geneva, active between 1868 and 1872. It demanded full equality between men and women, which was considered too radical for many feminists at the time.

== Foundation ==
The origins of the association may perhaps be traced to the 1854 proposal by the Swedish feminist Fredrika Bremer for a women-only organization dedicated to peace. The Swiss feminist Marie Goegg-Pouchoulin (1826–99) was active in the International Peace and Freedom League when it was founded in 1867, became a member of its central committee and edited the league's journal Les États-Unis d'Europe. On 8 March 1868 the journal published Goegg's proposal to create an international association of women in connection with the league. This became the Association Internationale des Femmes (AIF).

Foundation of the AIF and of Eugénie Niboyet's feminist and pacifist weekly La Paix des Deux Mondes mark the start of identification by women with peace work. According to the historian Sandi Cooper, Goegg was responding to the growing militarism of Prussia and aimed for, "the re-education of mothers to prevent another generation of boys trained to respect the false idols of national glory through military conquest.

The AIF was the first transnational women's organization. It was concerned with women's suffrage and with secular education. The association demanded "equality in salary, in instruction, in the family, and in the law". An AIF membership card issued to Matilde Bajer of Copenhagen in December 1870 states that its goals were, "To work for the moral and intellectual advancement of woman, for the gradual amelioration of her position in society by calling for her human, civil, economic and political rights."

== History ==
The association's position was too extreme for many middle-class women, so the number of members remained relatively small. The association's activities were disrupted by the 1870 Franco-Prussian War, but it was revived by Goegg at the end of 1870. The organization received international coverage in pacifist and feminist publications, such as the journal Woman, edited and published in Italy by Alaide Gualberta Beccari. However, the association failed to develop a strong organizational foundation. By 1872 the AIF was viewed with suspicion, since the word "International" was associated with the Paris Commune. Members were also divided over Goegg's leadership.

In June 1872 a communique was issued that called for a meeting at the home of Julie von May von Rued in Bern to organize a new association called Solidarité: Association pour la défense des droits de la femme (Solidarity: Association for the Defense of Women's Rights). Signatories included Caroline de Barrau of France, Josephine Butler of England, Christine Lazzati of Milan and the German feminists Rosalie Schönwasser, Marianne Menzzer and Julie Kühne. Marie Goegg-Pouchoulin was also active in this organization.

== Sources ==
- Berkovitch, Nitza (1999-04-29). From Motherhood to Citizenship: Women's Rights and International Organizations. JHU Press. ISBN 978-0-8018-6028-7.
- Cooper, Sandi E. (1991-11-11). Patriotic Pacifism : Waging War on War in Europe, 1815-1914: Waging War on War in Europe, 1815-1914. Oxford University Press, USA. ISBN 978-0-19-536343-2.
- Elshtain, Jean Bethke; Tobias, Sheila (1990). Women, Militarism, and War: Essays in History, Politics, and Social Theory. Rowman & Littlefield. ISBN 978-0-8476-7470-1.
- Moynagh, Maureen Anne (2012). Documenting First Wave Feminisms. University of Toronto Press. ISBN 978-0-8020-9134-5.
- Offen, Karen M. (2000). European Feminisms, 1700-1950: A Political History. Stanford University Press. ISBN 978-0-8047-3420-2.
- Rappaport, Helen (2001). Encyclopedia of Women Social Reformers. ABC-CLIO. ISBN 978-1-57607-101-4.
- Schelbert, Leo (2007-04-23). Historical Dictionary of Switzerland. Scarecrow Press. ISBN 978-0-8108-6447-4.
- Tripp, Aili (2006-07-01). Global Feminism. NYU Press. ISBN 978-0-8147-2794-2.
