= Marie Goegg-Pouchoulin =

Swiss feminist (1826-1899)

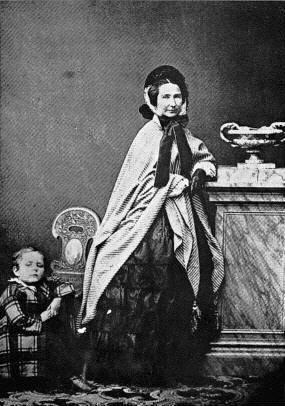
- Marie Goegg-Pouchoulin
- Born: 24 May 1826; Geneva, Switzerland
- Died: 24 March 1899 (aged 72); Geneva, Switzerland
- Organization: Association internationale des femmes
- Spouse: Amand Goegg

Marie Goegg-Pouchoulin (1826–1899), was a pioneer in the women's rights movement and women's peace movement in Switzerland. She has been called the first feminist in Switzerland. In 1868, she founded Association internationale des femmes (IAW), which was not only the first women's organisation in Switzerland, but also the first international women's organisation. She was a central figure in the continental activism for women's equal rights and better education.

== Life ==
Marie Goegg-Pouchoulin was born in Geneva. After elementary education, she worked in the shop of her father, who was a clock maker. She married in 1845 and divorced in 1856. She married secondly to the exiled German revolutionary Amand Goegg, and lived in London with him for a while before returning to Switzerland. The couple separated in 1874 but never divorced.

In 1867, she attended the congress of the newly founded International League for Peace and Freedom (ILPF) in Geneva. Disappointed in the lack of female participation within it, she founded the Association internationale des femmes (IAW) the following year.

At the ILPF congress in Bern 1868, she made a public speech on women's rights. At the same congress, the first meeting of the IAW was held, followed by the first congress in 1870. This was the first international collaboration of women's rights groups, predating the introduction of the International Council of Women in 1888, uniting groups who worked for women's access to education, access to public sphere and abolition of regulated prostitution. The IAW was closely affiliated with the ILPF, who added women's rights to its demands. Marie Goegg-Pouchoulin stated that the participation of women in the public sphere was vital for the ILPF's peace goal, which was a successful statement with the ILPF. She also supported women suffrage.

In 1871, the IAW was discredited because of its affiliation with the Paris Commune, and Marie Goegg-Pouchoulin stepped down from her involvement in it. After this, she focused on women's rights within Switzerland in particular. In 1872, she founded the Association pour la défense de la Femme av droit (or Solidarité), where she worked alongside another pioneer of the Swiss women's rights movement, Julie von May (von Rued). After a campaign initiated by Goegg-Pouchoulin, women were given access to the University of Geneva in 1872. Between 1875 and 1880, she served as chairperson of the Solidarité. She participated in the campaign to reform the civil code. In 1880, the Solidarité was dissolved. In 1886, she was elected to the board of the International Abolitionist Federation. In 1891, she was elected vice president of the newly founded Union des femmes de Genève.
