= R. M. Williams =

Australian businessman (1908–2003)

R. M. Williams AO CMG
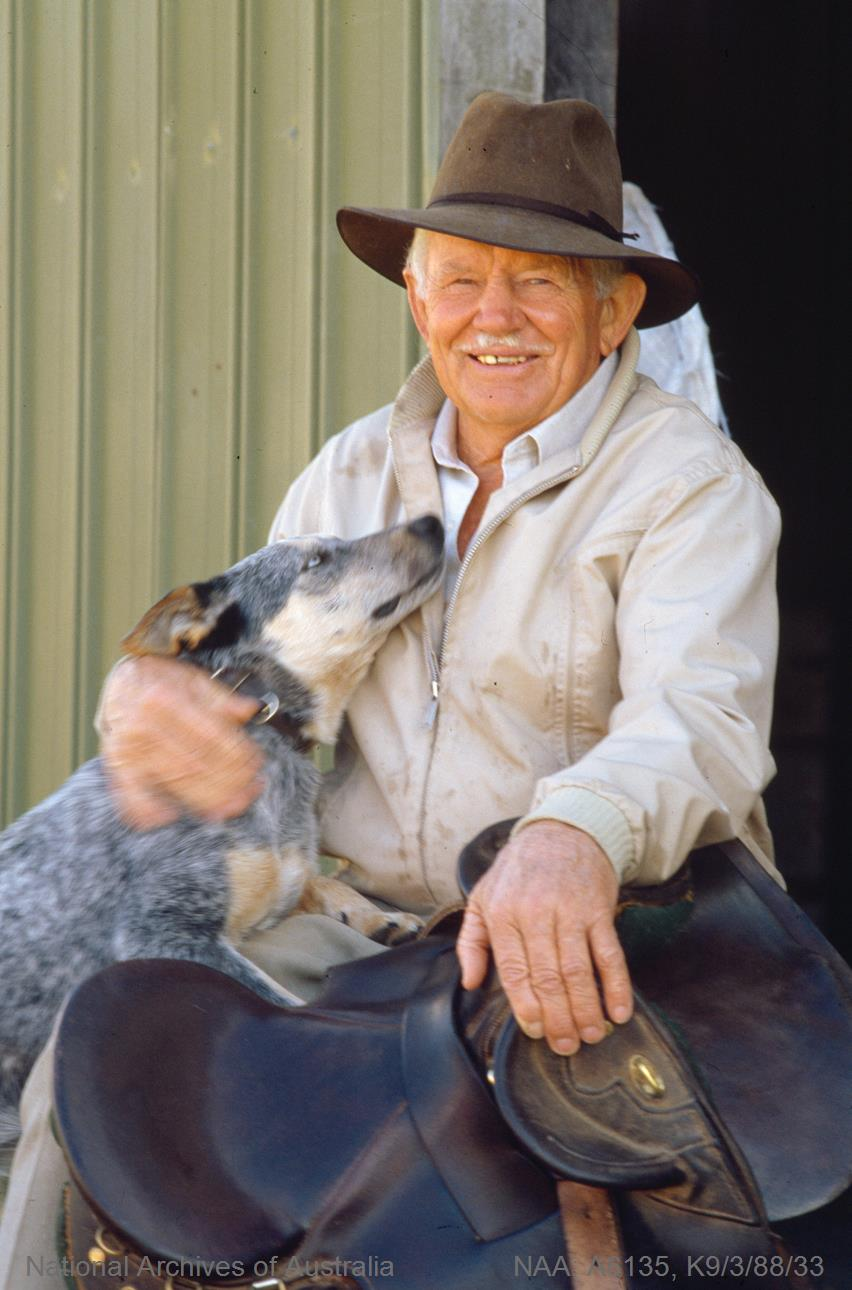
- Williams with his blue heeler in 1988
- Born: Reginald Murray Williams; 24 May 1908; Belalie North, South Australia
- Died: 4 November 2003 (aged 95); Toowoomba, Queensland, Australia
- Occupations: Entrepreneur, bushman
- Years active: 1926–2003
- Known for: Founder of the eponymous company R. M. Williams

Reginald Murray Williams AO CMG (24 May 1908 – 4 November 2003) was an Australian bushman and entrepreneur who rose from a swagman to a millionaire. He was born at Belalie North near Jamestown in the Mid North of South Australia, 200 kilometres (120 mi) north of Adelaide CBD, into a pioneering settler family working and training horses. Williams had many adventures in Australia's rugged outback as a bushman, and became known for creating an Australian style of bush clothing and footwear recognised worldwide and the company that bore his name.

== Personal life ==
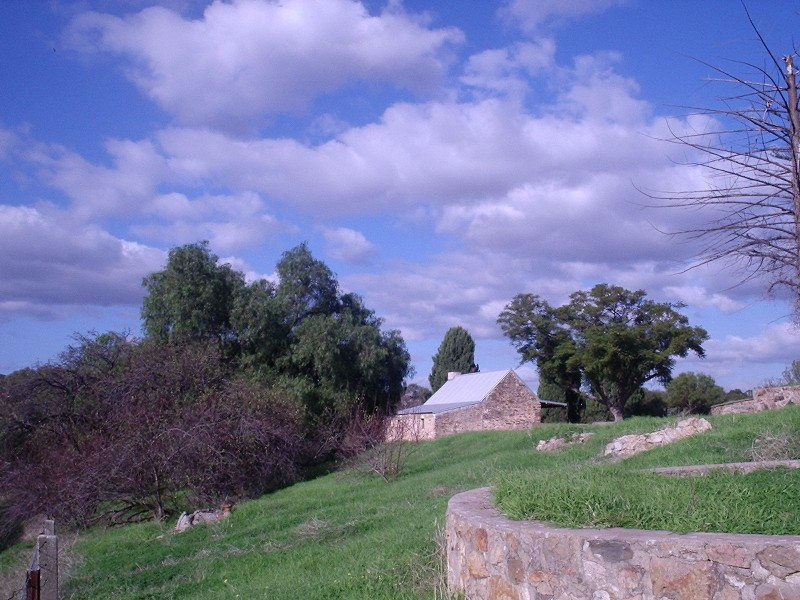
Stockman's quarters on Williams's property at Dry Creek

From Welsh ancestors, his maternal grandfather Richard Mitchell being from Cornwall, Reginald Murray Williams was born to Joe Williams and his wife on 24 May 1908.

When he was 10 years old, Williams's family moved to Adelaide so that he and his two sisters could attend school there. School did not agree with him and so, at 13, Williams packed his swag and left for the land he loved. At 18, he started work as a camel driver and spent three years trekking through the Australian desert, living with Aboriginal Australians and learning to survive the harsh conditions. During the Great Depression in Australia, Williams returned to Adelaide, where he met Thelma Ena Cummings, who would become his first wife. After they married, they settled in South Australia's Flinders Ranges and had six children.

After the marriage broke up in the 1950s, Williams purchased 55 hectares (140 acres) of land behind Yatala Labour Prison, South Australia. There, Williams constructed a homestead, planted vineyards and thousands of roses, and ran rodeos on the floodplain of Dry Creek. When the land was compulsorily acquired during the time of former State Premier Sir Thomas Playford, Williams left South Australia for his Rockybar property in Eidsvold, Queensland, vowing never to return to South Australia.

He remarried in 1955 to Erica, had four more children, living at the North Burnett cattle station in Queensland. In 1985, he co-wrote his autobiography, Beneath whose hand.

Williams died at his home in Toowoomba on the Darling Downs in Queensland, on 4 November 2003. He was 95. His life was celebrated at a state funeral at Toowoomba, Queensland, on 13 November 2003.

== Company ==
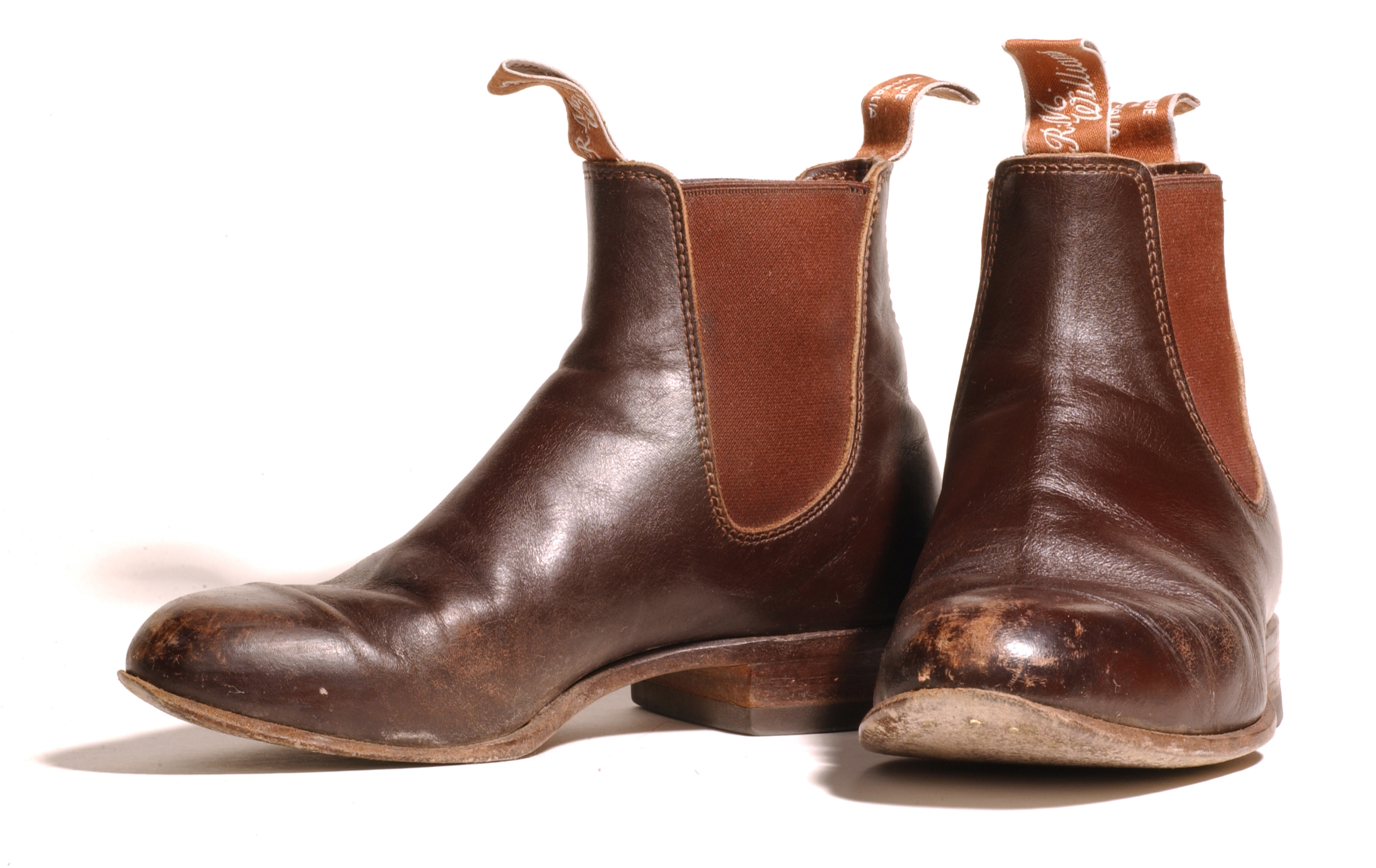
A pair of R. M. Williams elastic-sided boots

Williams learned his leather-working skills from an Aboriginal stockman called "Dollar Mick" Smith, making bridles, pack saddles and riding boots near Nepabunna in the northern Flinders Ranges. He set up a workshop and employed local Adnyamathanha people from the Nepabunna Mission, who played an important part in building up his business between 1932 and 1934. Williams had since 1927 been employed as a missionary by the United Aborigines Mission (UAM), an interdenominational Christian group which had set up the mission in 1931. In 1932, with his son's illness and the expense of hospital treatment, he was in need of money and began selling his saddles to Sir Sidney Kidman, a wealthy pastoralist.

In April 1934, Williams moved back to Adelaide and started a small factory running in his father's back shed in Prospect, that rapidly expanded. To address financial problems, he also became involved with the Nobles Nob gold mine, near Tennant Creek in the Northern Territory.

Williams's most successful products were hand-crafted riding boots. Williams's boots were unique when they were introduced to the market, as they consisted of a single piece of leather that was stitched at the rear of the boot (the models that featured an elastic side have been particularly popular).

Williams sold the business in 1988 to the long-established South Australian stock and station agents Bennett & Fisher Limited. That business went into receivership in 1993, after banks were concerned about A$16 million of debts.

R. M. Williams Pty Ltd was then placed under the ownership of long-time friend Ken Cowley, who acted in partnership with Australian business mogul Kerry Stokes, and together with his family, presided over R. M. Williams Pty Ltd for two decades.

In October 2020, the LVMH Moët Hennessy Louis Vuitton (LVMH) Group agreed to sell the company to Andrew Forrest's Tattarang investment company.

== Honours ==
In 1985, Williams was appointed a Companion of the Order of St Michael and St George (CMG), for services to the outback community.

In 1992, he was named an Officer of the Order of Australia (AO), for service to business and to the community.

In 2001, he was awarded the Centenary Medal.

== Publications ==
Williams established a national magazine, Hoofs and Horns, in 1944, aimed at cattlemen and horsemen.

- A song in the desert. Pymble: Angus & Robertson. 1998. ISBN 0-207-19832-2.
- Beneath whose hand / the autobiography of R. M. Williams. South Melbourne: Pan Macmillan Australia. 1984. ISBN 0-333-38087-8.
- The bushman's handcrafts. Netley, South Australia: R. M. Williams Pty Ltd. 1943. ISBN 0-9599299-0-8.
- I Once Met a Man. Angus & Robertson. 1995. ISBN 0-207-19024-0.
- Animal Stories. Outback Publishing. ISBN 0-9579709-1-9.

Williams also published the 300+ pages of poetry anthology Saddle for a throne in 1953. The poems of Scottish-Australian bush poet Will H. Ogilvie (1869–1963) struck a chord with Williams, who shared the affinity of Ogilvie with horses and the Australian outback.

== Legacy ==
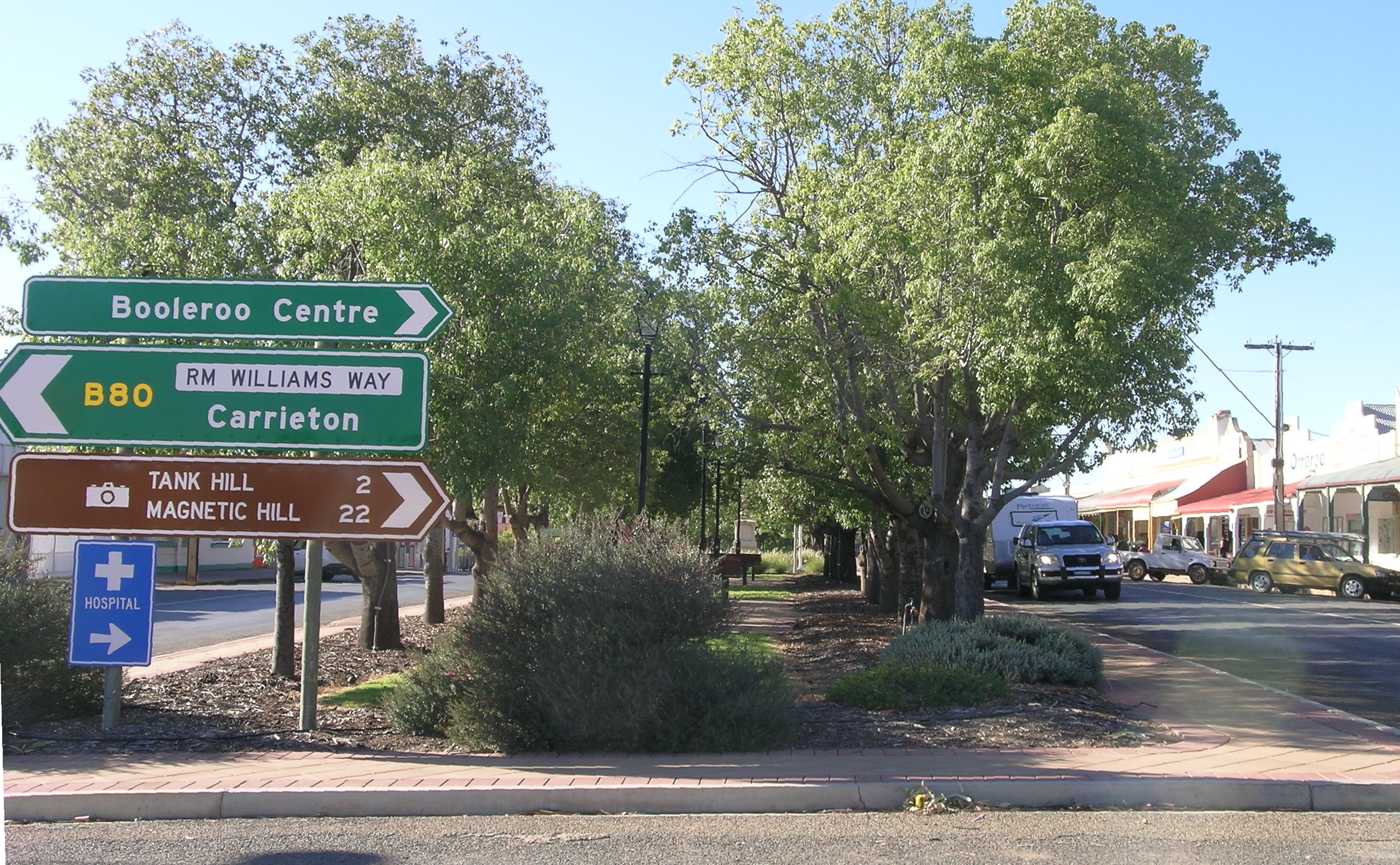
RM Williams Way road sign at Orroroo

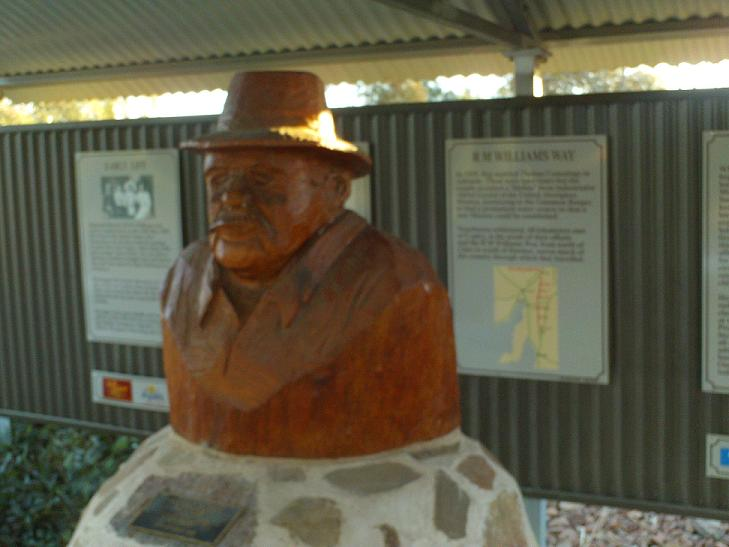
R. M. Williams Monument in Jamestown, South Australia

The bush businessman has left several legacies:

- The Australian Stockman's Hall of Fame. Originating as an idea by artist Hugh Sawrey, RM Williams was an original board member of this institution that was opened in Longreach, Queensland, by Her Majesty, Queen Elizabeth II, on 29 April 1988.
- Founded the Australian Roughriders Association.
- Helped to form the Equestrian Federation of Australia (1951).
- Led a committee which initiated and planned the Bicentennial National Trail.

A major road in South Australia's mid north, which runs between Stanley Flat (near Clare) and Hawker, via Jamestown has been named the RM Williams Way in his honour.

== See also ==
- R. M. Williams Outback, aka Outback, a bi-monthly magazine of Australia
