= Carillon City =

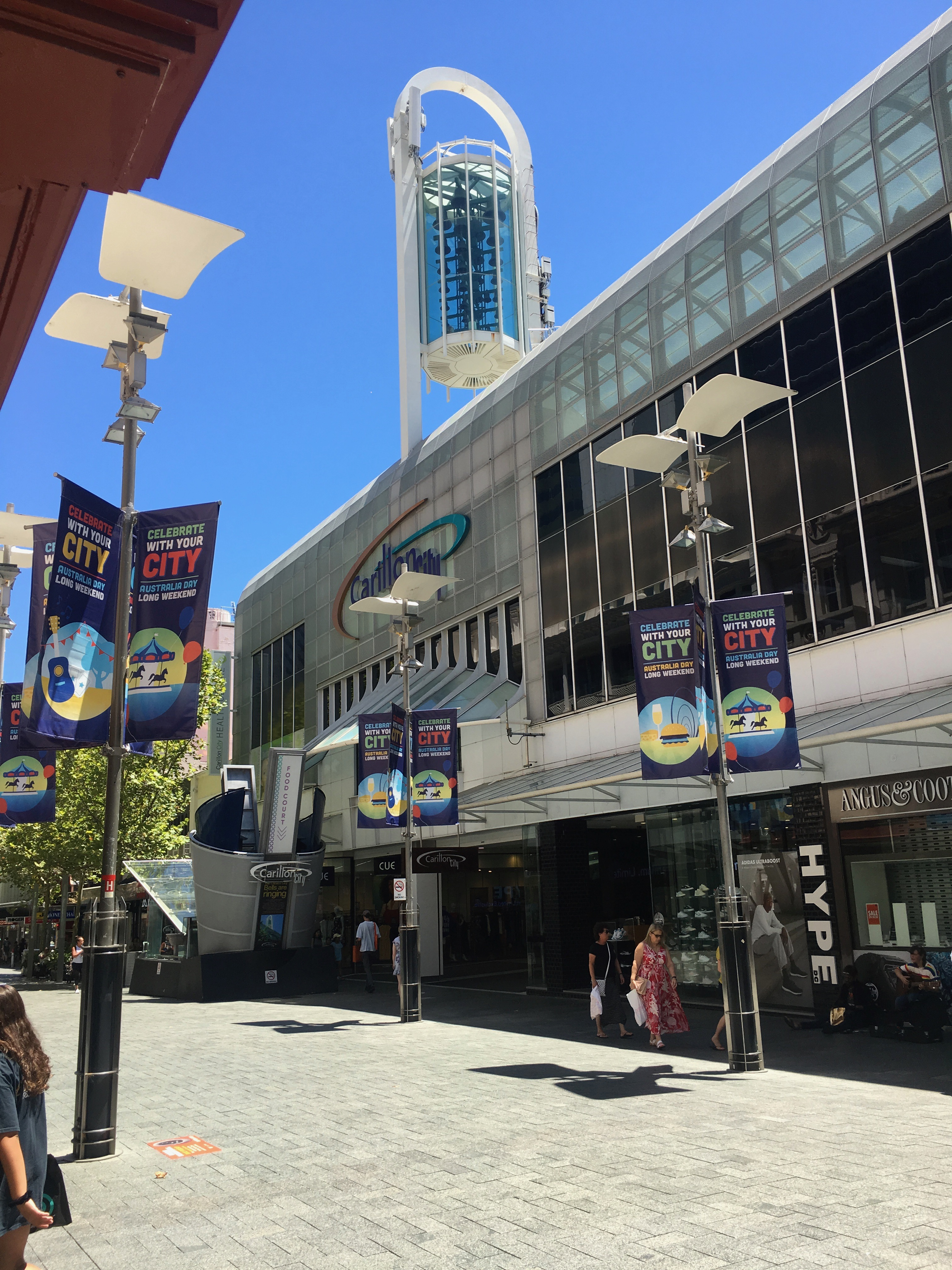
- Carillon City from Hay Street, circa 2019
- Location: Perth, Western Australia
- Coordinates: 31°57′13″S 115°51′32″E
- Opened: 1970 (City Arcade); 1982 (Carillon Arcade)
- Closed: 1 November 2021
- Owner: Tattarang
- Num. of stores: 0 (Previously 144)
- Num. of anchor tenants: 0
- Floor area: 11,670 m^{2} (125,600 sq ft) (excludes office tower), 16,451 m^{2} (177,080 sq ft) (includes office tower)
- Floors: 5
- Parking: 0
- Website: www.carilloncity.com.au

Carillon City was a major Australian shopping centre in Perth, Western Australia. It was located in the middle of the Perth main retail precinct between the Hay and Murray Street malls, at the southern end of Forrest Place. It was linked to St Georges Terrace by way of access through Trinity Arcade and an arcade under Hay Street Mall. Walkways and a pedestrian overpass connected the Cultural Centre, public carparks, the adjacent Forrest Chase shopping centre and the rail and bus terminal with Carillon City.

As of April 2025, the centre sits mostly empty, except for a few stores facing Murray Street and Hay Street. It is planned to undergo redevelopment involving demolition of the existing centre and replacing it with new buildings.

== History ==
Originally, the centre was two individual arcades known as City Arcade and Carillon Arcade. City Arcade was constructed in 1970 and refurbished in 1980. It also includes a 14 story office tower above the arcade on the Murray Street end. Carillon Arcade was opened in 1982. Some of the original tenants were Miss Maud, Four Seasons and Sasellas Tavern, all of which had remained at the same locations throughout all the changes undertaken to the centre. In 1996, the Perth Tourists Lounge opened on the fifth floor; it was targeted primarily at overseas visitors particularly from Asian destinations to relax while visiting and shopping within the city areas.

Sometime in 1998, City Arcade was purchased by the Hawaiian Property Group and Multiplex Property Trust. From July 1999 to March 2001, City Arcade and Carillon Arcade were merged into what is now known as Carillon City through the addition of interconnecting walkways at a cost of $3 million.

In 2006 the food court was refurbished at a cost of $6 million, the upgrades included new escalators and improvements to the Hay Street entrance.

In 2016, property group Dexus bought the centre for $140 million at a yield of 5.47% for its Dexus Wholesale Property Fund.

On 1 November 2021, the centre closed for redevelopment except for a few stores with storefronts facing Murray Street and Hay Street, though it remains open for pedestrians travelling between the two streets and Forrest Chase. On 29 April 2022, it was announced that Tattarang bought the centre.

In 2024, the mostly empty Carillon City hosted art installations for multiple cultural festivals. This included being turned into a wetland for Perth Festival, and an extended multi-artist visual art installation for the Strange Festival. In 2025, the centre hosted an exhibit documenting abandoned Perth buildings as part of the Boorloo Heritage Festival.

== Redevelopments ==
As part of the merger of the two arcades in 1998, extensive refurbishment works were undertaken to increase the aesthetic appeal of the new combined arcades.

In December 2013, the western end of the Carillon City site was demolished to make way for a new Topshop Topman store, which opened in October 2014. The store had a floor space of 2,200 square metres (24,000 sq ft), the same size as the largest Topshop Topman store in Australia at the time which was located in Brisbane. The store closed in July 2017, less than three years after opening amidst financial difficulties for the company in Australia. A Cotton On outlet would later occupy the space.

In 2019 Dexus proposed a new redevelopment that would include a Hoyts cinema, a 24-storey mixed-use tower, and a 17-storey office and education building above the existing structure.

On 29 April 2022, it was announced that Tattarang will transform Carillon City into a world-class retail and experiential precinct. The $400 million redevelopment plans will encompass two towers on either side of a central plaza surrounded by retail and hospitality businesses, with one 17-storey tower containing a hotel with the other 31-storey building consisting of student accommodation.

On 20 May 2025, the Tattarang (via Fiveight) proposal received planning approval.

== Architectural features ==
The centre gets its name from the Carillon Bells, a group of 35 bells launched in 1983 which play melodic sounds. Carillon City's carillon is one of only four carillons in Australia.

On the south-western side of the complex was a three-storey glass atrium with a two-storey glass spiral staircase between the first and second storeys. On the eastern side of the property is a fourteen-story office block.

== Transport ==
As the centre connected with two major pedestrian malls there was no direct transport to the location. However, the area is well serviced by bus links along St Georges Terrace, as well as services from the Perth Busport and the Elizabeth Quay Bus Station. Rail services are available from the nearby Perth railway station.
