= R. M. Williams Outback =

- Editor: Mark Muller
- Categories: Australia
- Frequency: Bi-Monthly
- Publisher: R. M. Williams Publishing Pty Ltd
- Founded: 1998
- First issue: September 1998
- Company: RM Williams
- Country: Australia
- Based in: Milsons Point, Sydney
- Language: English
- Website: Outback
- ISSN: 1441-1776

R. M. Williams Outback (or simply Outback) is a bi-monthly magazine of Australia. The magazine was established in 1998 with first issue in September. Its center of focus and target audience are toward Australians living and working in the Australian Outback. It commonly features stories, articles and advertisements about life on a ranch, work, and products thereof. It is published in Australia and circulated primarily in Australia and New Zealand, although subscription is available world wide.

The magazine is the recipient of the Australian Magazine Award.

== See also ==
- R. M. Williams
