= R. M. Williams (company) =

Australian footwear and clothing retail company

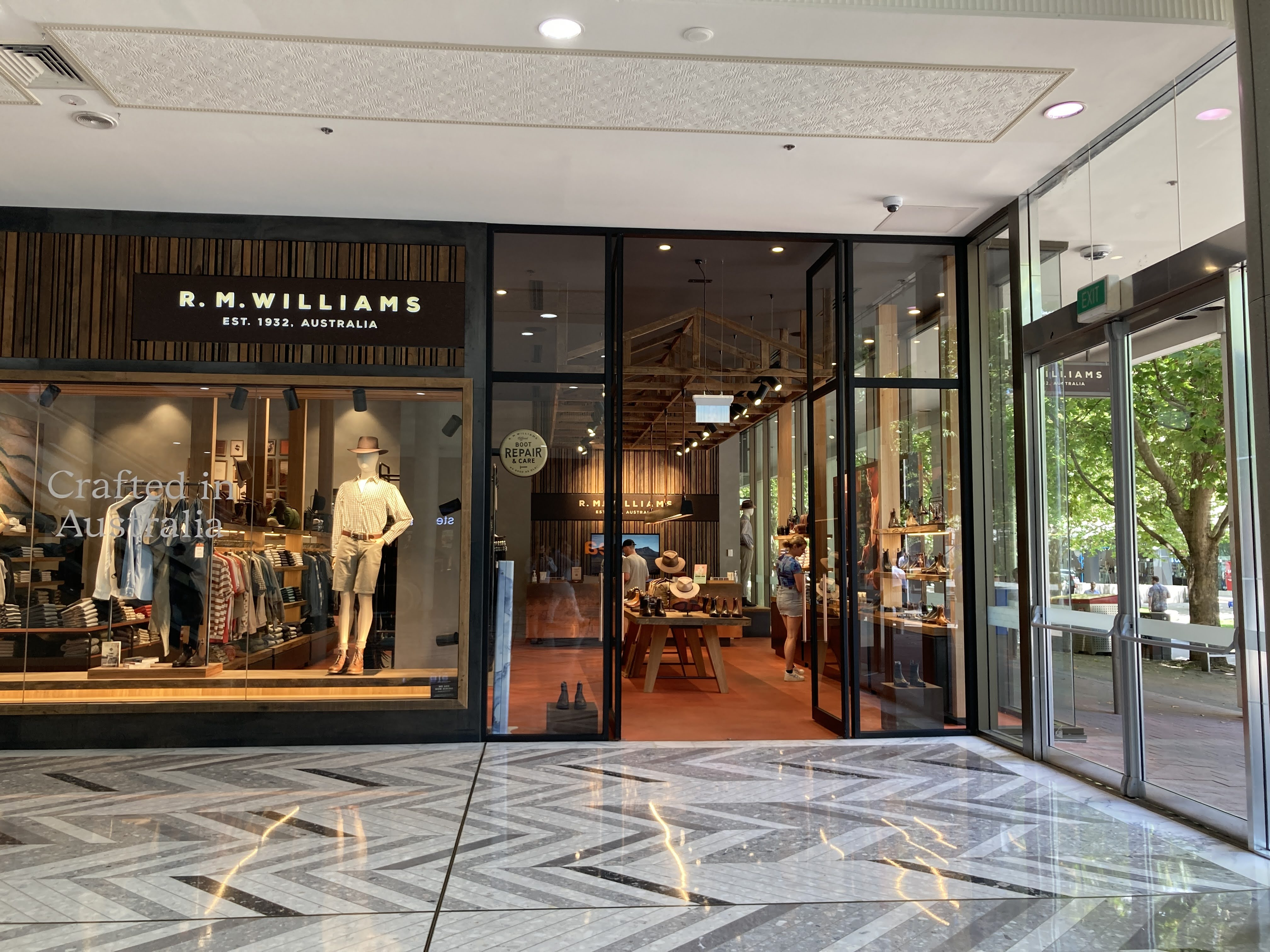
- R. M. Williams store in the Canberra Centre
- Type: Private
- Industry: Manufacturing; Retail
- Founded: 1932; 94 years ago
- Founder: R. M. Williams
- Headquarters: Adelaide, Australia
- Key people: Paul Grosmann (CEO)
- Products: Clothing; Footwear
- Number of employees: ~900 (2020)
- Parent: Tattarang
- Website: www.rmwilliams.com.au

R. M. Williams is an Australian footwear and clothing company. It is best known for producing chelsea boots for men and women. The company was founded by R. M. Williams. It is currently owned by Tattarang, an investment company owned by mining magnate Andrew Forrest.

== History ==
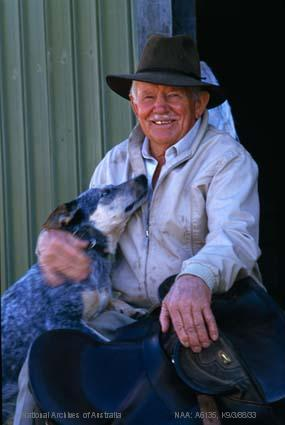
R. M. Williams founded the company in 1932

R. M. Williams learned his leather-working skills in the Flinders Ranges region of South Australia, from a stockman called Michael George Smith, commonly known as “Dollar Mick”, who was originally from Lyndhurst, a bit further north. Smith was camping at Italowie Gorge in the Gammon Ranges (part of the Flinders), not far from where the Nepabunna Mission had been established by the United Aborigines Mission (UAM), an interdenominational Christian group, in 1931. Williams had become a missionary with the UAM in 1927. Dollar Mick, who was an Aboriginal man, taught Williams how to make bridles, pack saddles and riding boots and general leatherwork skills. Dollar Mick and Williams together developed the distinctive design that is a variation on the chelsea boot, made out of one piece of leather, that became a cornerstone of the business.

In 1932, with his son's illness and the expense of hospital treatment, Williams was in need of money and began selling his saddles to Sidney Kidman, a wealthy pastoralist. With the money earned from the first orders, Williams started a small factory.

In addition to Dollar Mick, who had married a local Adnyamathanha (Yura) woman, Williams employed several Adnyamathanha people from the mission. The Yura people had been making waterbags (yakutha) and clothing (valdha) from animal skins, sewn with bone needles, for a long time before European settlement. Oral accounts passed down through the generations is corroborated by written sources of the time, including reports in the UAM newsletter, The United Aborigines’ Messenger, producing a timeline of the growth of the workshop from 1932 to 1934, often written by Williams or his wife, Thelma. Younger boys were paid “by results”, being paid a penny for each component, such as a sole. Older men were paid fifteen shillings each week, as well as being provided with meals, boots and clothing. The workers were expected to "uphold Christian teaching", and the boys were not allowed to undergo traditional initiation rites. A pair of boots sold for 20 shillings by mail order in March 1934.

In December 1933, Williams wrote to the Chief Protector of Aborigines, reporting that his workshop supported 9 people as well as himself and his wife. He departed the mission in April 1934, after Thelma had returned to Adelaide to have their baby son Ian's trachoma treated, and another missionary took over his post at Nepabunna. There had been some friction between Williams and the UAM, possibly because they wanted him to pay the mission so that they could distribute the money, while he wanted to pay the Adnyamathanha people wages, although different versions of the story exist. Williams also asked for government to help fund his growing industry. Much later (1984), Williams said "had we been allowed to remain and develop the ideas which later were the foundation of our large industry, that alone could have transformed the lives of the people economically”.

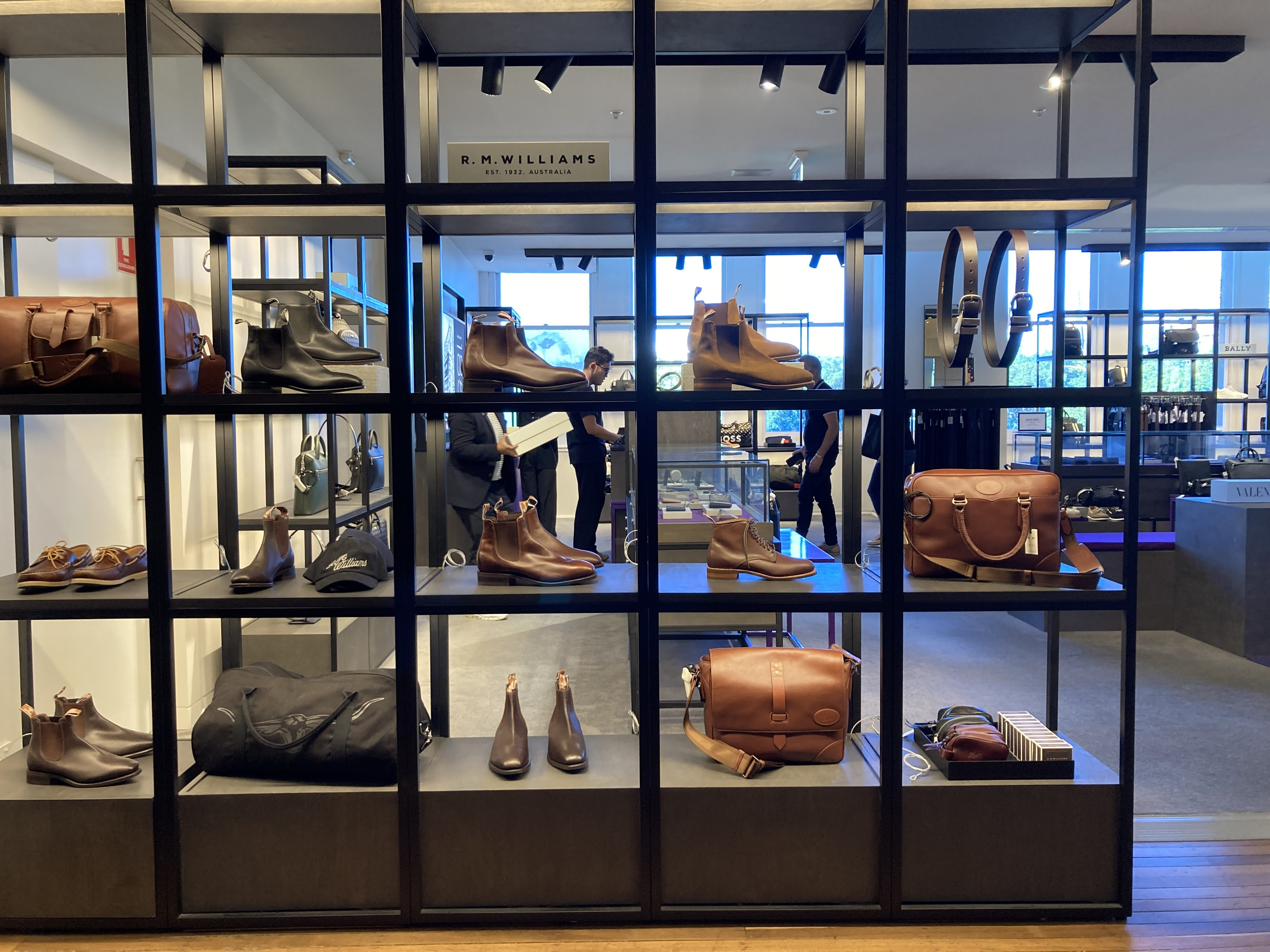
A range of R. M. Williams products for sale in a David Jones store

Back in Adelaide, Williams restarted his factory in his father’s shed in Prospect. In the 1950s, a small group of Nepabunna people went to see "old Reg" in Adelaide, but were disappointed by his lack of enthusiasm for meeting them, and did not get to see his wife. “Dollar Mick” Smith died in 1969, after moving back up north to Lyndhurst after the death of his wife at Nepabunna. There remains a feeling among the local Yura descendants of his workers that he did not properly acknowledge their contribution to his success, in particular Dollar Mick and a man called Rufus Wilton.

Williams sold the business in 1988 to the long-established South Australian stock and station agents Bennett & Fisher. That business went into receivership in 1993, after banks were concerned about $16 million of debts. R.M. Williams was then placed under the ownership of long-time friend Ken Cowley, who acted in partnership with Australian business mogul Kerry Stokes, and together with his family, presided over R.M. Williams for 10 years. In late 2003, Cowley assumed full ownership of R.M. Williams when he bought out Stokes' and other shareholders' stake for $12.5 million.

On 26 March 2013, the Cowley family released a statement which announced an intention to sell the company to a new owner for $100 million. The statement described the sale process as an assessment of "external commercial growth and expansion plans", and the list of potential buyers included LVMH, Oroton and Premier Investments. In April 2013, R.M. Williams sold a 49.9% stake to L Capital Asia, the private equity affiliate of LVMH. In 2014, L Catterton increased its stake to 82%. In February 2016, LVMH took full ownership.

In May 2019, R.M. Williams was placed for sale, with its owners reportedly seeking $500 million. As of April 2020, L Catterton owned the majority share with 82%, IFM Investors owned 13% and actor Hugh Jackman owned the remaining 5%.

In October 2020, Andrew Forrest's Tattarang investment company acquired R.M. Williams for $190 million.

== Products ==
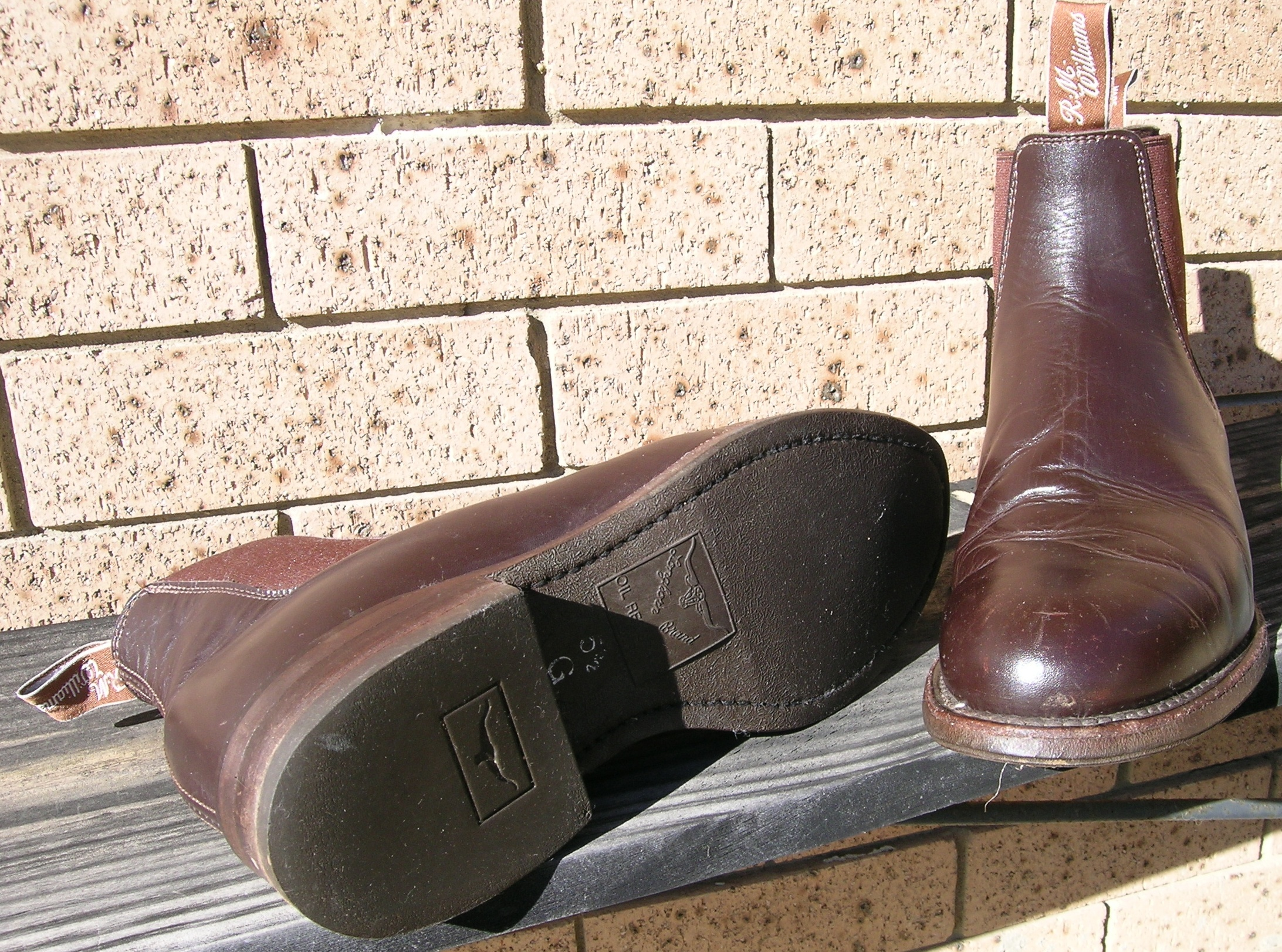
R.M. Williams elastic side riding boots

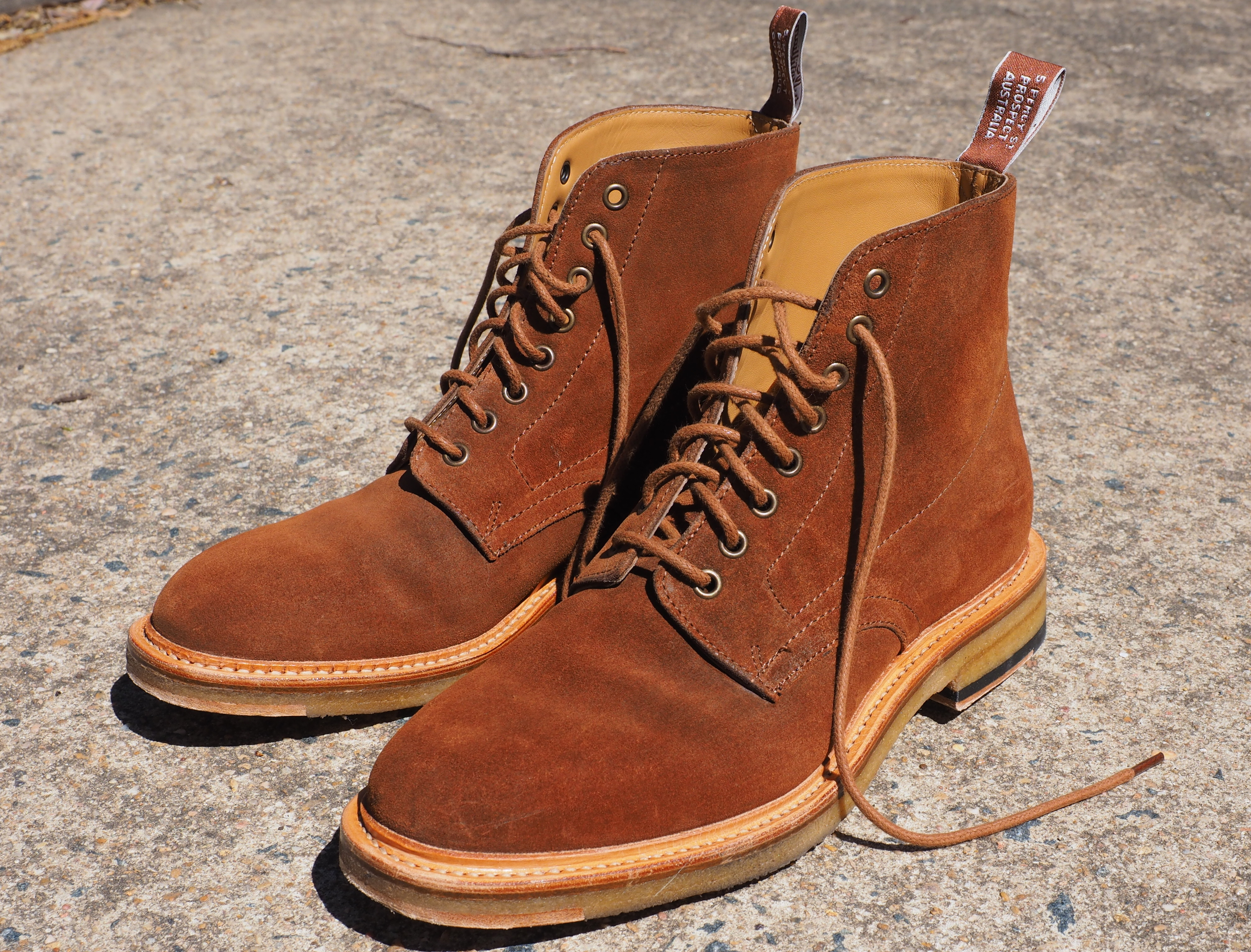
R.M. Williams lace-up boots

RM Williams' most successful products were handcrafted riding boots. These boots were unique when they were introduced to the market, as they consisted of a single piece of leather that was stitched at the rear of the boot (the models that featured an elastic side have been particularly popular). As of 2013, the R.M. Williams Company produced handcrafted riding boots, with the use of 70 hand processes and a single piece of leather externally (with the inside lining being made up of several pieces).

Over recent years R.M. Williams has focused on becoming a luxury shoe company aimed at city-dwellers. R.M. Williams boots are often worn by Australian politicians. Pairs of the boots have also been given to foreign leaders by Australian prime ministers.

R.M. Williams' Craftsman boots were selected as the Australian Army's standard parade boots in 2013 following a competitive tender.

The company brand is a Texas longhorn cattle head. Since 2015, Hugh Jackman has been a brand ambassador for the company.

== Manufacturing ==
In late 2019 it was reported R.M. Williams was doubling its production of boots to 500,000 pairs per year by 2023, and was aiming to achieve revenue of A$153 million over 2019.

As of 2022, R.M. Williams makes their leather boot range, belts, small leather goods, and a growing portion of their apparel and accessories in their Adelaide-based workshop.

== Locations and employees ==
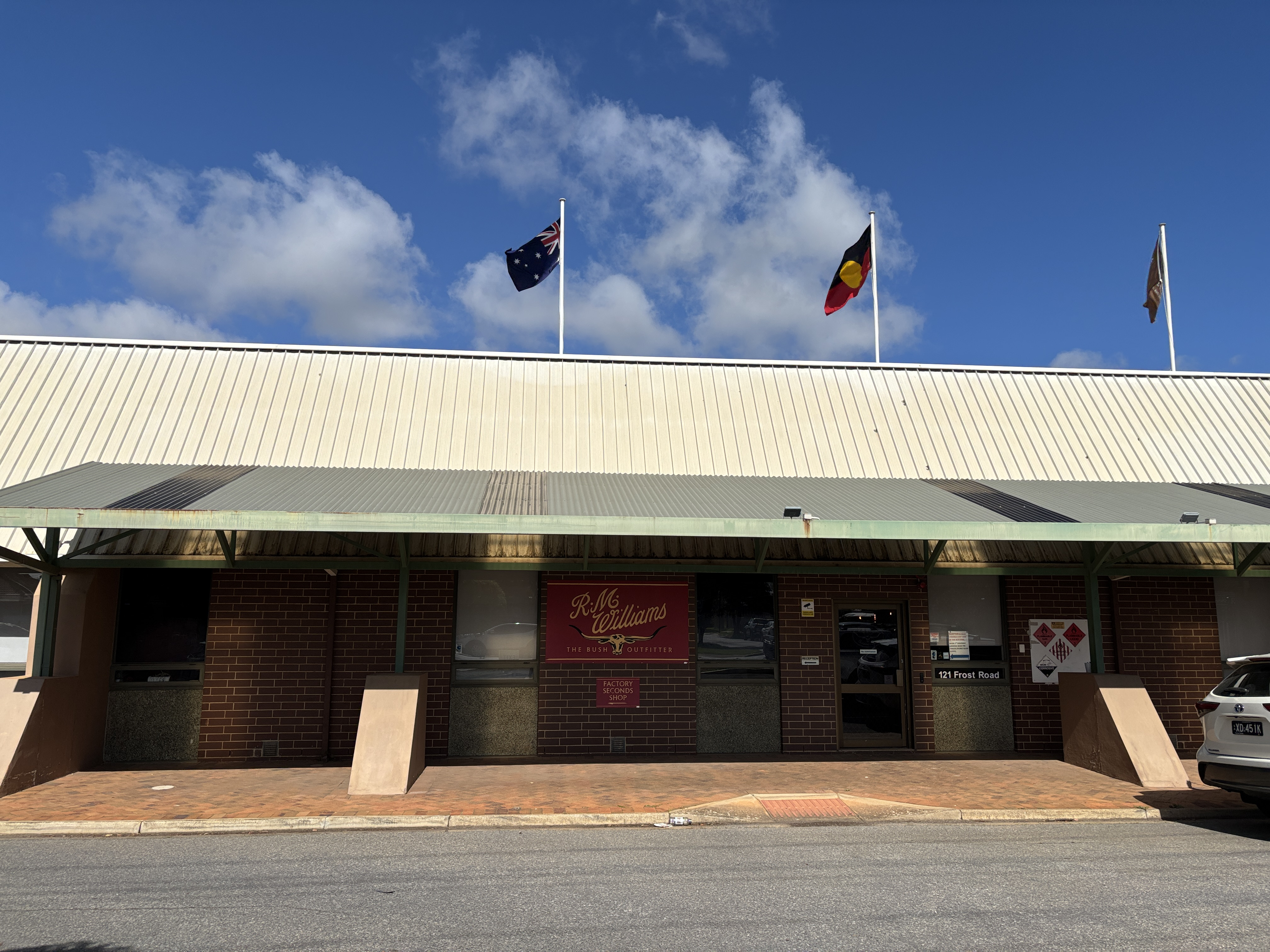
The R.M. Williams headquarters and factory in Salisbury, South Australia

R.M. Williams' headquarters is located in Salisbury, South Australia, a suburb of Adelaide. As of March 2013, R.M. Williams Pty Ltd consisted of 50 retail stores, 900 stockists and exports to 15 countries. In 2013 the company employed 600 people globally, 300 of them based in South Australia.

As of December 2020, it operated around 64 of its own retail stores in Australia and seven in other countries. As of 2019, its boots were available in 500 department stores.

In 2020 it employed 400 people at its Salisbury workshop and another 500 across Australia.

A new combined workshop, factory and distribution facility was opened at a site next door to R.M. Williams main shoemaking factory at Salisbury in October 2025.

== See also ==
- Australian work boot
- R.M. Williams Outback, aka Outback, a bi-monthly magazine
