= Emu Brewery =

Former brewery in Perth, Western Australia

- Formerly: Albion Brewery; Stanley Brewery
- Founded: 1837; 189 years ago
- Founder: James Stokes
- Fate: Acquired in 1927; 99 years ago
- Successor: Swan Brewery; Lion Nathan
- Headquarters: Mounts Bay Road, Perth, Western Australia, Australia
- Key people: James Stokes; Henry Saw; William Meloy; John Maxwell Ferguson; William Mumme; George Hamersley; Hugh Hamersley; D. W. Harwood; John Jones; Robert Hall; Michael O'Connor
- Brands: Emu
- Building details
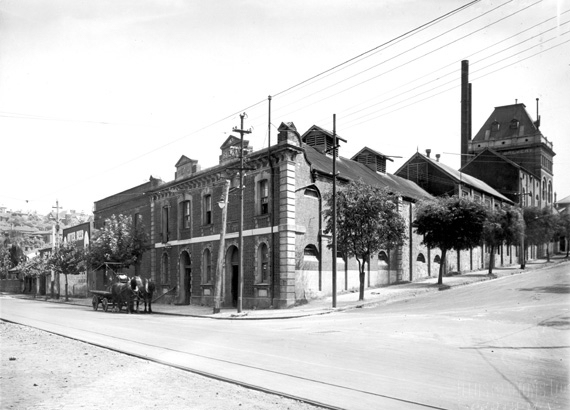
- The brewery in the 1900s

- Location within Perth
- The Emu Brewery was situated on a block bounded by Mounts Bay Road, Spring Street and Mount Street.

General information
- Coordinates: 31.954857°S 115.850545°E
- Demolished: 23 February 1992; 34 years ago

The Emu Brewery was a brewery in Perth, Western Australia, which traced its history to the first decade of the Swan River Colony. Founded in 1837 by James Stokes as the Albion Brewery, it was located beside the Swan River on a block bounded by Mounts Bay Road, Spring Street and Mount Street. The business changed hands several times – and names from Albion Brewery to Stanley Brewery to Emu Brewery – until its ultimate acquisition by competitor Swan Brewery in 1927.

New brewery buildings were constructed over the years. The most notable of these was an imposing Art Deco building erected between 1936 and 1938. This building continued to be used to produce Emu-brand beer until the late 1970s, when production was shifted to a new factory in Canning Vale. As of January 2025, Emu beer continues to be produced as a brand of Swan Brewery owner Lion Nathan.

== Albion Brewery: 1837–1848 ==
In the early 1830s, the Swan River Colony was in its infancy and did not have a substantial local beer industry. Preachers from the Temperance League lobbied against the drunkenness prevalent in the colony, however the lack of locally produced beer meant that they focused their attention on spirits drinkers. Governor James Stirling believed that the construction of a local brewery may reduce the Colony's drunkenness problems by allowing the men to drink beer instead of spirits.

Scotsman James Stokes had arrived in Western Australia in 1834 at the age of 24. He saw the opportunity in the market for a brewery, and investigated potential sites. Surveyor-General John Septimus Roe had set aside a small triangular lot for use as a brewery; this block was bounded by Spring Street, Mount Street and St Georges Terrace. Stokes preferred the much larger block across Spring Street, which extended almost all the way to the riverfront at the time; subsequent reclamation moved the riverfront further south. The site was more suitable because it featured a natural spring, there was a sufficient different in elevation to enable the use of gravity in the brewing process without the need for a large tower. The proximity to the river also made river transport an attractive option. Stokes bought this land from George Leake, and was operating his brewery by 1837. Although the brewery was named the Albion Brewery after the ancient name for Great Britain, it was more popularly known as Stokes' Brewery. It was the colony's first major stand-alone brewery.

At the time, darker beer varieties were popular in Britain, however Stokes believed that the pale ales that were being exported to India would become popular locally. Contrary to what Governor Stirling had hoped, Stokes began distilling spirits at the brewery in 1838.

In 1839 Stokes mortgaged the brewery site back to the original owner, Leake, to fund the purchase of the adjacent block. There, he built himself a house; around this time he also bought the small portion of river frontage immediately in front of the brewery from the government for £13/5s/-, equivalent to A$1,618.44 in 2022. In the same year, Stokes also formed a partnership in land and commission agents with Dubois Aggett, however in 1840 Aggett maimed himself while attempting suicide, and Stokes severed the partnership.

1840 also saw the market for Albion Brewery's beer fall away due to a sluggish economy. It did not escape Stokes' attention that duties were levied on imported spirits, but not on those produced locally. Seizing upon the business opportunity, he imported a large still and expanded the brewery's distillery. The Government responded to this by imposing a tax on locally produced spirits as well, leading Stokes to stop Albion's distilling efforts.

== Stanley Brewery: 1848–1908 ==
Eventually the market situation improved for Stokes to the point that in 1848 he opened a new brewery on the site to replace the old Albion Brewery. The Stanley Brewery opened on 1 November 1848, selling what it described as a "nutritious body ale superior to any imported", costing £4/– per hogshead, equivalent to A$2.28 per litre (34 US fl oz) in 2022.

Along with other local businessmen, Stokes successfully lobbied for the transportation of convicts to Western Australia to help alleviate the chronic labour shortage. It has also been speculated that he saw it as a potential new market for his beers, believing that the convicts would have less discerning tastes.

Stokes returned to England in 1857, where he married his cousin Julia. He returned to the Swan River Colony with his pregnant wife, however she died after giving birth. Stokes quickly lost his interest in brewing and died in 1861. The brewery continued to be operated by Henry Saw and William Meloy, who had worked in the business for many years and to whom Stokes had bequeathed interests in the business. Saw died in November 1870, and since Meloy did not want to remain in the operation, the lease over the brewery was advertised.

John Maxwell Ferguson took over the lease, and in 1872 recruited the German expatriate brewer William Mumme. (Note: William Mumme, brother of Emil Mumme, arrived in Adelaide in September 1857 with the family of Frederick and Marie Mumme from Hamburg aboard Peter Godefroy.) Over the following decades, the business changed hands several times.

In January 1875 the brewery was advertised for rent with the previous operators being Mumme and Ferguson. In May 1875 George Hamersley applied for a licence to operate the Stanley Brewery and by September 1875 it had been re-equipped and was open for business. The licence was then held by brothers George and Hugh Hamersley. On 1 April 1876 he formed a partnership to operate the brewery with his brother Hugh and D. W. Harwood who was a brewer. In November 1876 it was advertised that the licence was to be transferred from G & H Hamersley to the new partnership. In November 1877 it was advertised that the licence was to be transferred from G & H Hamersley to Harwood. In March 1882 the licence was transferred to John Jones and Robert Hall. In May 1882 there was a Supreme Court case between John Forrest, who was the husband of George and Hugh's sister, and Harwood concerning a breach of contract in the amount of £160 relating to the lease of the Stanley Brewery which had expired in February 1882.

In 1887, a new brewery building was constructed on the site. The brick structure was imposing, featuring blind brick arches, and was topped with a Mansard-roofed tower containing a 45,000-litre (12,000 US gal) tank.

After the successful initial public offering of the rival Swan Brewery, the Stanley Brewery felt the pressure to follow the same path. In 1905 the business re-formed as the Stanley Co-operative Brewery Ltd, and had former politician Michael O'Connor as chairman of its board of directors. This new company was majority-owned by the Stanley Brewery Co Limited.

== Emu Brewery: 1908 onwards ==
The Stanley Brewery's most popular brand of beer was an ale sold under the "Emu" trademark. In order to ensure that drinkers knew from which brewery the Emu brand came, as well as to avoid confusion between the Stanley Co-operative Brewery Limited and its similarly named holding company, the company was renamed on 6 March 1908 to the Emu Co-operative Brewery Ltd.

The Emu Brewery had been turning out beer of variable quality, and only managed a quarter of the output of the Swan Brewery. However, the recruitment of Ernest Terry in 1909 led to a turnaround in the fortunes of the newly renamed Emu Brewery Ltd. The brewery became profitable once more, and even won awards for its beers at the Royal Agricultural Show, which dismayed the traditional award winner, Swan. Emu continued to compete with Swan by introducing Emu Bitter, a bottom-fermentation beer to compete with the bitter beer Swan introduced in 1923.

=== Acquisition by Swan Brewery and subsequent history ===
On 3 February 1927, the brewery's directors approached the Swan Brewery to sell Emu's assets. Swan proceeded with this acquisition of the Emu Brewery, and continued to operate it as a separate business from Swan's own operations. Arthur Jacoby was appointed as the general manager of both breweries.

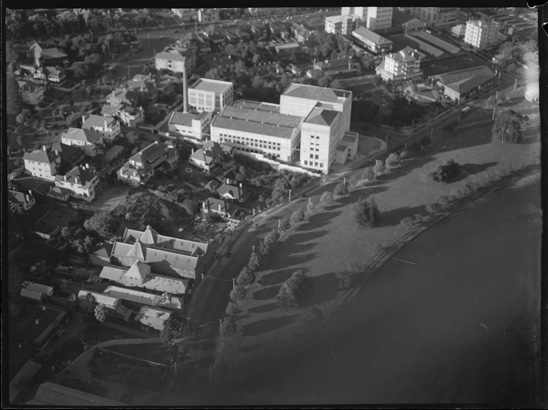
An aerial view of the new complex in 1938

During the 1930s, a significant amount of land was reclaimed from the river, and the brewery lost its river frontage. Also, between 1936 and 1938, a new brewery building designed by Perth architectural firm Oldham, Boas and Ednie-Brown was constructed on the site. Constructed in the Art Deco style, this new building replaced the old Stanley Brewery building.

The building was built from reinforced concrete and steel, and was visibly divided into two halves: one with windows to allow in a maximum of daylight, and the other with no windows at all, to exclude daylight. A central tower housing a lift and staircases delineated the two areas. A border frieze at the top of three of the building's sides depicting different stages in the brewing process was designed by John Oldham and executed by sculptor Edward F. Kohler. An image of the 1938 building featured on Emu beer labels for over fifty years.

Unlike the dark and dingy interiors usually associated with the older type of breweries, the Emu Brewery will be finished to secure brightness, airiness and a maximum of natural light.

— The West Australian, 22 February 1936

Distinguished by its simplicity of line in the vertical style and the absence of overhanging cornices it is an outstanding example of modern design as applied to industrial building.

— The Western Mail, 19 January 1939

The Emu Brewery continued manufacturing on the site until the late 1970s, when production of both the Swan and Emu brands was shifted to a factory in Canning Vale. After this, the Emu Brewery building was left derelict. In 1991, the Emu Brewery was the "last major industrial structure" in Perth's central business district.

Despite having been placed on the Register of the National Estate, the complex was allowed to fall into disrepair. The Art Deco Society of Western Australia (Note: Art Deco Society of Western Australia includes an architect's perspective drawing (thumbnail) of the Emu Brewery on its home page.) was set up in 1987 to lobby for the protection of Perth's art deco heritage, including the Emu Brewery. After heritage minister Jim McGinty refused to place the building on the Western Australian Register of Heritage Places, the building was demolished starting in late 1991 and ending with its implosion on 23 February 1992.

Subsequent plans to build high-rise offices or apartments on the site consistently fell through for almost a quarter of a century, leading to the site being labelled "seemingly jinxed". Eventually, in 2017 the first of three towers planned as part of a development called Mia Yellagonga was completed. Called Karlak, this tower has 32 levels and is the new headquarters for Woodside.

== See also ==
- List of breweries in Australia

== Sources ==
- "Emu Brewery (former), Spring St, Perth, WA, Australia (Place ID 18139)". Australian Heritage Database. Australian Government.
- "Art Deco in Western Australia". Art Deco Society of Western Australia. Archived from the original on 11 October 2007.
- Brown, Pam (15 November 2007). "Brewery's birthday". The West Australian. p. 3.
- Hatch, Dan (29 October 2008). "Leighton to build offices on Emu site". The West Australian. p. 67. "Perth City Council was expected last night to approve a two-tower office development on the seemingly jinxed old Emu Brewery site on Spring Street."
- Kimberly, Warren Burt, ed. (1897). "William Mumme". History of West Australia. Melbourne: 100–101. Wikidata Q126729227.
- Lenaghan, Nick (30 October 2016). "Capital Square rises on Perth's old Emu brewery". Australian Financial Review.
- Lovelady, Shannon (n.d.). "Emu Brewery (1938-1992)". Museum of Perth.
- Milne, Peter (17 September 2018). "Inside Woodside's new high-tech 32-storey offices at old Emu Brewery site". The West Australian.
- "Multiplex appointed to deliver fit-out for new woodside headquarters". Multiplex. 21 June 2017. Archived from the original on 23 May 2018.
- "Capital Square, Perth".
- Seddon, George; Ravine, David (1986). A City and its Setting: Images of Perth, Western Australia. Fremantle: Fremantle Press. ISBN 0-949206-08-3. LCCN 87131959. OCLC 16866226. OL 2438825M. Wikidata Q135222492.
- Shield, Helen (2 August 2017). "Intrigue over $600m Central Park tower". The West Australian.
- Spearritt, Peter (1991). Emu Brewery, Perth: assessment of cultural heritage significance (Report). National Centre for Australian Studies, Monash University.
- Spiller, Geoff (2003). Norton, Suzanna (ed.). Micro-breweries to monopoly and back: Swan River Colony breweries 1829–2002. Perth: Western Australian Museum. ISBN 1-920843-01-9.
- Taylor, Robyn (1988). "Edward F. Kohler, Perth sculptor 1890–1964". In Bromfield, David (ed.). Essays on Art and Architecture in Western Australia. Nedlands: University of Western Australia Centre for Fine Arts. pp. 1–11. ISBN 0-86422-070-7.
- Staff writer (7 October 2008). "Preserving precious art deco". Western Suburbs Weekly. p. 9.
