= Miss Maud =

Australian café and hospitality business

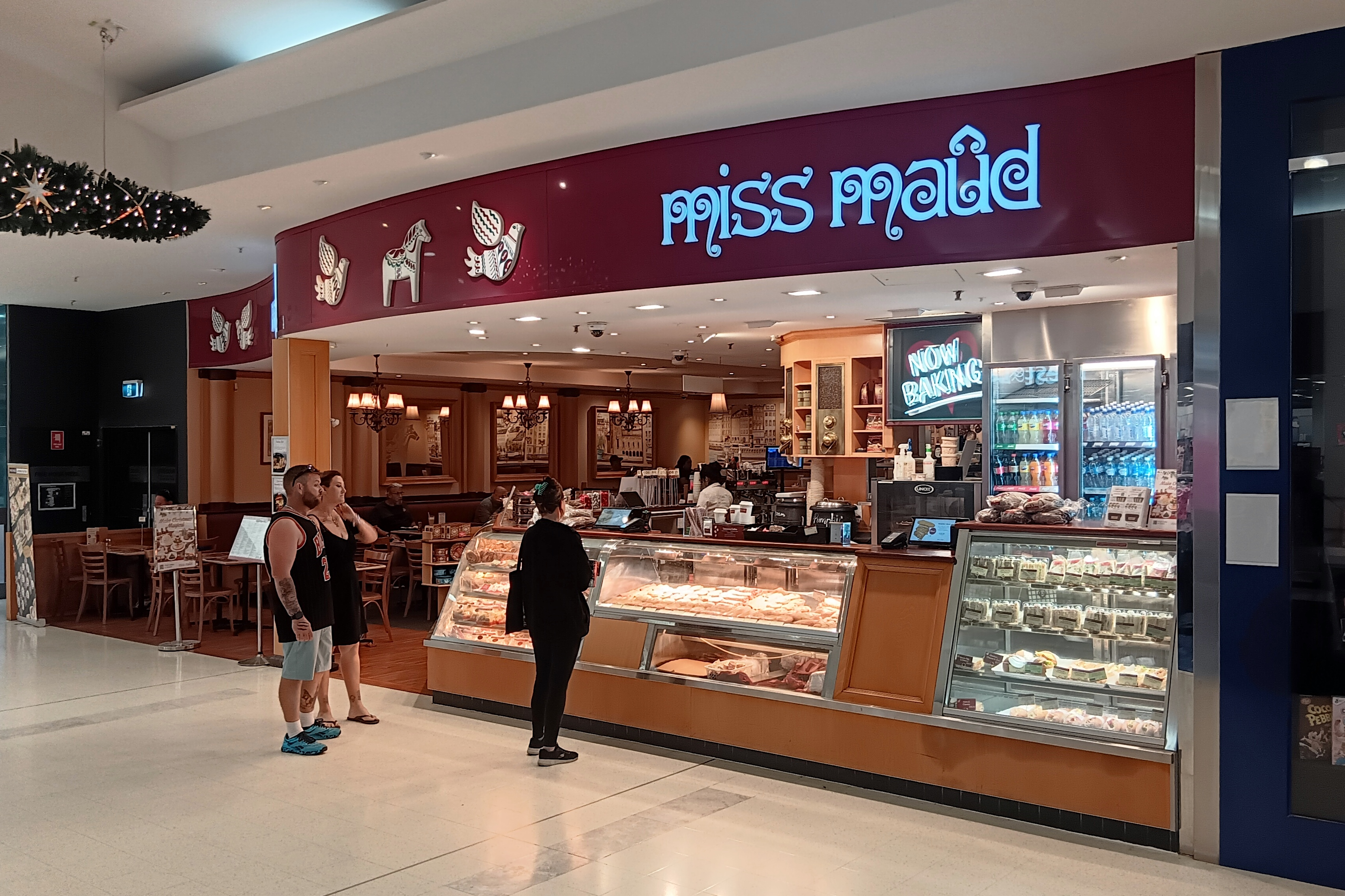
- Miss Maud Carousel in 2025
- Industry: Hospitality
- Founded: 1971
- Founder: Maud Edmiston
- Headquarters: 136 Fitzgerald Street, Northbridge, Western Australia, Australia
- Website: www.missmaud.com.au

Miss Maud is a hospitality group based in Perth, Western Australia, which as of 2025 comprises fifteen pastry houses (cafés) and a catering service, all located in Western Australia. The company also formerly owned a 52-room boutique hotel and restaurant in the Perth CBD, and operated two outlets under the Cafe Stockholm brand. They briefly expanded into Sydney in 2003.

The company employs over 500 staff. Their baristas and hospitality staff receive training at an internal training school, the Miss Maud Academy.

== History ==
The business was founded in 1971 by Maud Edmiston, a Swedish immigrant, who opened a small Swedish-style pastry house in City Arcade, Perth to resemble the bakery near her home in Stockholm.

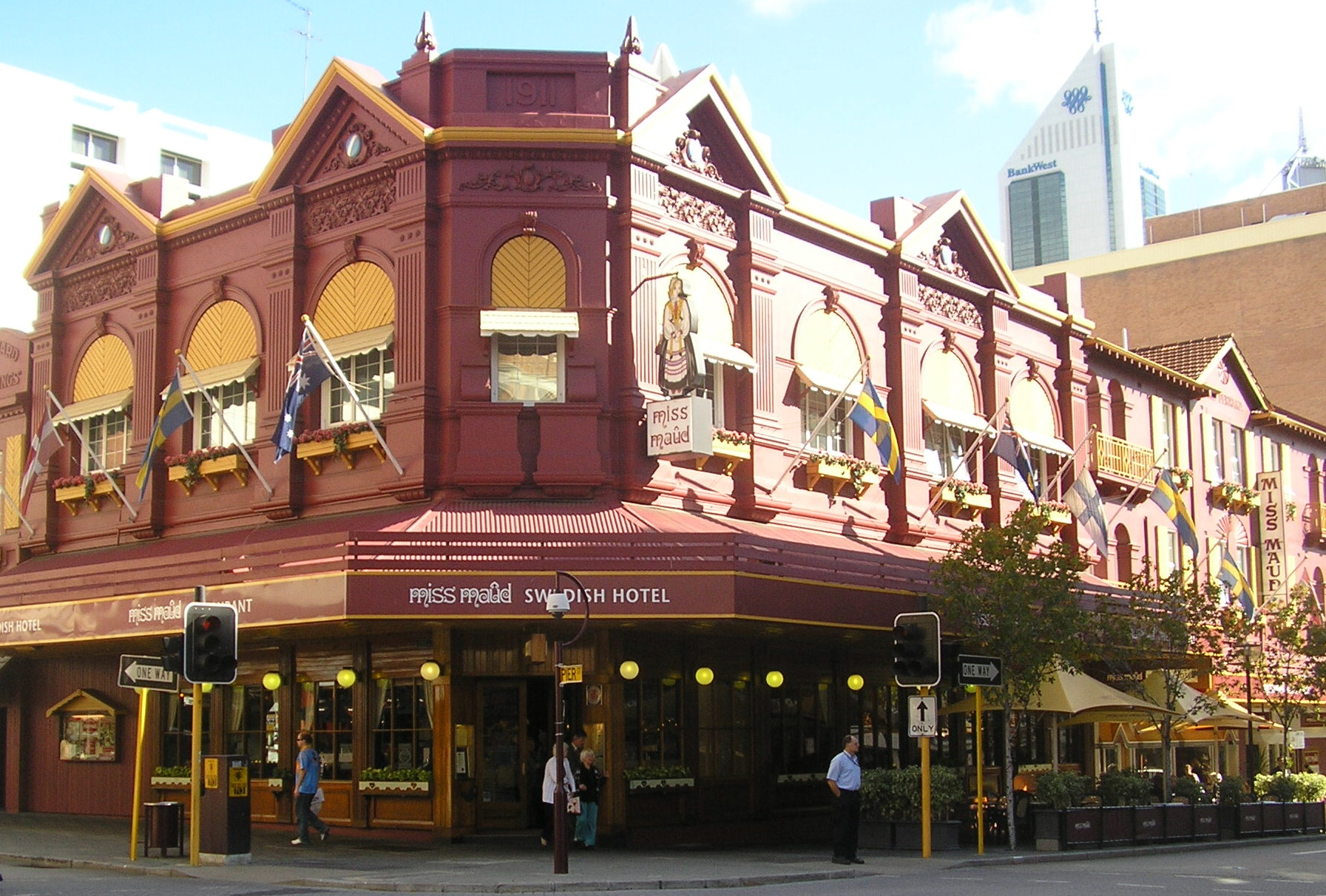
The Miss Maud hotel in 2006

In 1973 Edmiston opened the Miss Maud Smörgåsbord Restaurant on the corner of Pier and Murray Streets. In 1977 the Miss Maud Private Hotel was opened at the same address. In 1979 she applied for the first al fresco dining area in Perth outside her restaurant in Pier Street. The restaurant has served a number of notable guests, including Queen Elizabeth II, King Carl XVI Gustaf and Queen Silvia of Sweden, and former Prime Ministers Paul Keating and John Howard.

In 1982 an expansion of the business interstate was planned. However, in May 1988 the company went into receivership following an investment into a failed resort development in the south-west of Western Australia, increased interest rates, and the stock market crash in October the previous year. In 1989 Edmiston traded her way out of receivership.

In 1992 Edmiston was named as "The Bulletin Qantas Business Woman of the Year", and in 1999 she was awarded the Order of the Polar Star. In 2001 she was recognised as "Western Australian Citizen of the Year – Industry and Commerce", the first and only woman to receive this award.

In 2003 Miss Maud opened their first pastry house on the east coast of Australia in the Westfield shopping centre in Miranda, New South Wales. The venture was short-lived as Edmiston did not like the constant interstate travel. In 2009 Edmiston launched a catering service. In 2013 the company opened their first Cafe Stockholm outlet at Karrinyup Shopping Centre; the brand has been described as being more modern than its Miss Maud pastry houses and is aimed towards a younger market. A second Cafe Stockholm outlet at Westfield Carousel was replaced by a second Miss Maud pastry house at the shopping centre in 2021.

In 2018 the company sold the Miss Maud Swedish Hotel and Restaurant to fund future expansion of its café business.

== See also ==
- List of restaurant chains in Australia
