= Swan Brewery =

Brewery company founded in Perth, Western Australia

- Industry: Alcoholic beverage
- Founded: 1857; 169 years ago
- Founder: Fredrick Sherwood
- Headquarters: Perth, Western Australia, Australia
- Products: Beer
- Owner: Lion, parent company Kirin Company

The Swan Brewery is a brewing company, whose high-profile brewery was once located beside the Swan River, in Perth, Western Australia.

== History ==
The brewery was established in 1857 by Frederick Sherwood at the foot of what is now Sherwood Court in Perth. The brewery was named for the black swans that Sherwood had seen on the river. Sherwood inherited a successful building firm from his father Richard in 1831 and migrated to the Swan River Colony, with his wife Jessey and three children in 1843. Sherwood, who had been working as an architect/surveyor/builder, established the brewery after the death of his wife, in order to support his six children. He saw the Swan River as the ideal place to build a brewery, as the Swan provided fresh, clean water for making the beer, hiring convicts as a source of cheap labour.

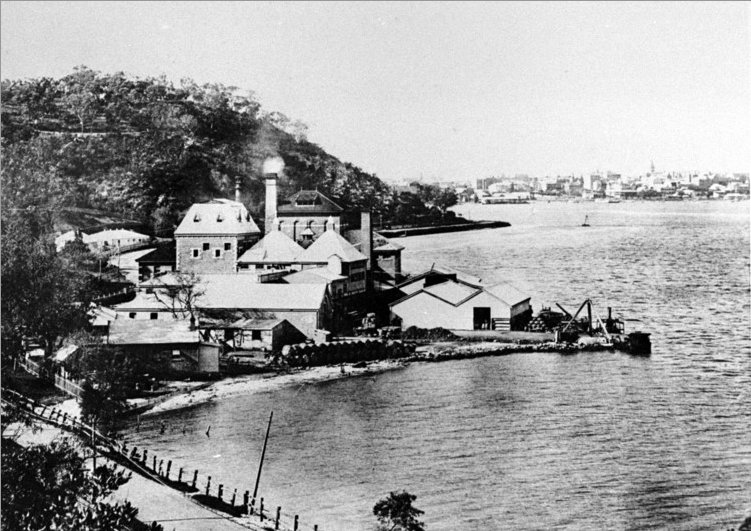
Swan Brewery c. 1890

Following Sherwood's death in 1874, the family offered the Swan Brewery for lease. The lease was taken up by the partnership of John Maxwell Ferguson and William Mumme, who appreciated the value of its pure water supply. In 1879 the Swan Brewery was moved to a site at the foot of Mount Eliza not far from the Stanley Brewery and another new brewery, the Lion Brewery. The former buildings continued to be used as a bottling plant. In 1886 the partnership between Ferguson and Mumme was dissolved and Mumme continued as part owner of the Swan Brewery. The Swan Brewery Company Ltd was incorporated in Melbourne in 1887.

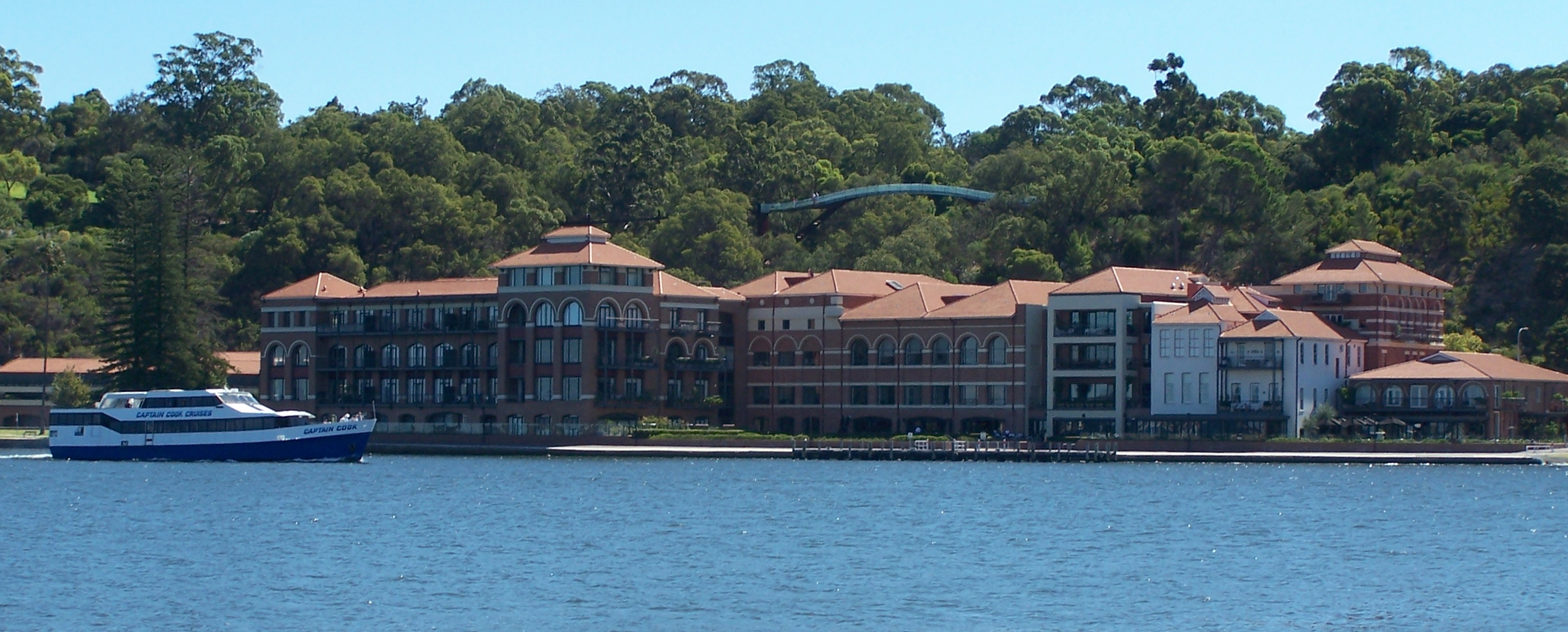
The redeveloped Old Swan Brewery complex, viewed from the Narrows

In 1888 the Swan Brewery took over the neighbouring Lion Brewery. In 1906 the bottling works attached to the brewery were destroyed by fire, with a new facility constructed closer to the city. In 1927 Swan acquired control of Fremantle's Castlemaine Brewery. In 1928 the Emu Brewery Ltd which can trace its origins back to the Albion Brewery was purchased by the Swan Brewery. In 1945 Swan bought the last other Western Australian brewing company, the Kalgoorlie Brewing Company. The brewery extended its operations to the Northern Territory in 1957, but in 1972 lost its foothold there to Carlton and United Breweries. The brewery ceased production at the Mounts Bay site in 1966 and moved all brewing operations to the Emu Brewery site in Spring Street. In 1966, it made an arrangement to brew Skol beer in Western Australia, discontinuing the line in 1975. In 1972, it invested in the New Guinea company of San Miguel and Swan Holdings Ltd, which it sold in 1974. In 1978 the brewery was relocated to Canning Vale, an industrial estate in Perth's southern suburbs. In October 1981 Alan Bond, through his company, Bond Corporation purchased the Swan Brewery for A$164M. In 1983 Bond Corporation acquired Castlemaine Tooheys for A$1,200M, and with this acquisition Bond Corporation controlled approximately half of Australia's beer market, virtually all of Western Australia, Queensland and New South Wales. In 1982 the Swan Brewery became a wholly owned subsidiary of Alan Bond's Bond Corporation. In September 1990 New Zealand brewing company, Lion Nathan purchased a 50% stake in Bond Corporation's brewing operations, Bond Brewing (which included the Swan Brewery), subsequently purchasing the remainder of the company two years later. As of 2007, Swan Brewery Pty Ltd, is a wholly owned subsidiary of Lion Nathan operating as independent brewery under the Lion Nathan umbrella. In 2009 Lion Nathan was taken over by Japanese brewer, Kirin Brewery Company.

On 12 October 2012 Lion Nathan resolved to close the Canning Vale operations of the Swan Brewery by March 2013 and move production interstate. The Swan and Emu beer brands and keg production would be transferred to the company's West End Brewery in South Australia and pack production would move to James Boag & Son Brewery in Tasmania.

== Old Swan Brewery site ==
Old Swan Brewery
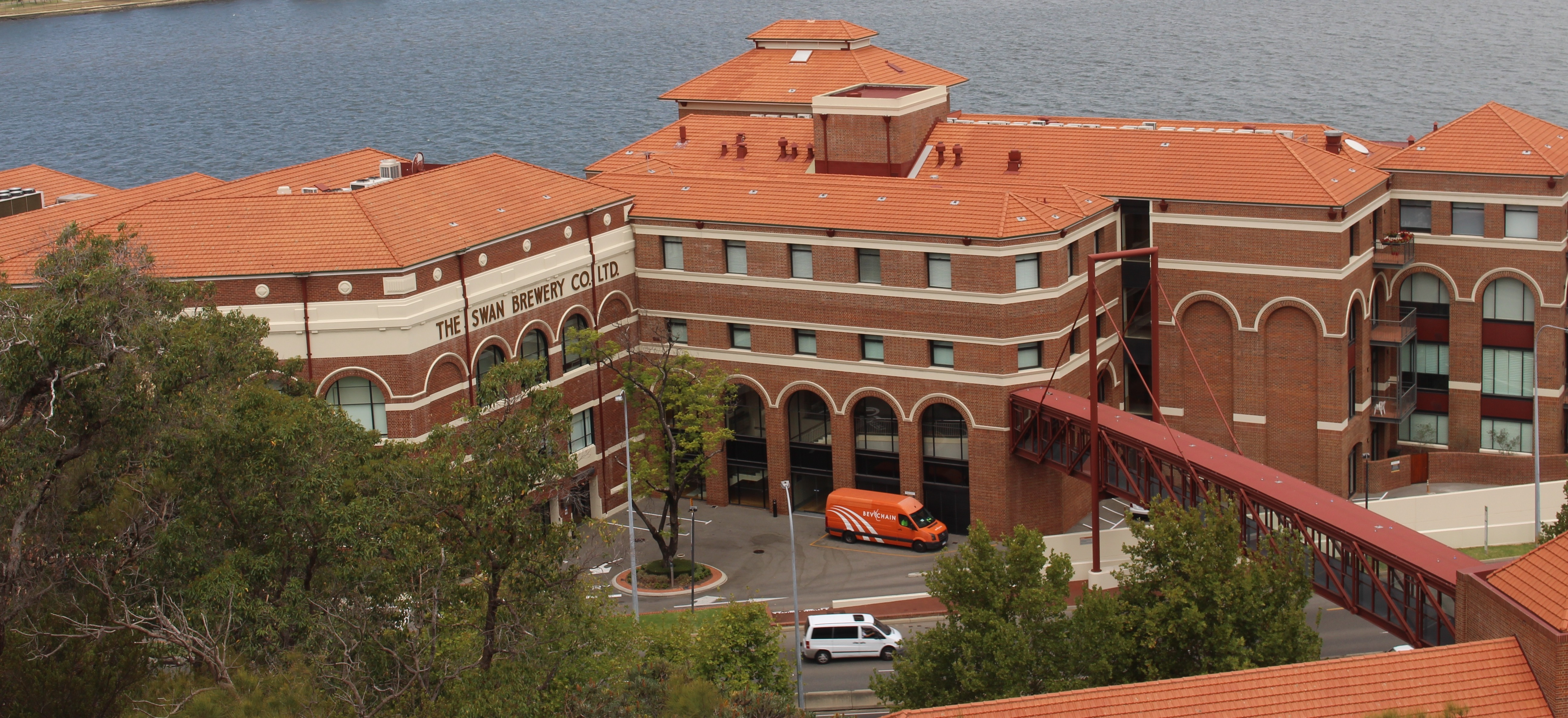
- The redeveloped Old Swan Brewery building as viewed from Kings Park, Western Australia

General information
- Type: Historic building
- Location: Perth, Western Australia
- Coordinates: 31.96509°S 115.84070°E

Western Australia Heritage Register
- Type: State Registered Place
- Designated: 16 June 1992
- Reference no.: 2186

The buildings that comprise the Old Swan Brewery complex were originally built in 1838 as a mill for timber-cutting as well as flour-grinding. These were the first steam driven mills in Western Australia, and were later taken over as one of the first convict depots (following the acceptance of convict transportation by the colony in 1850). The buildings were subsequently (between 1859 and 1879) used as a tannery, and at one time contained a restaurant (used by travellers between Perth and Fremantle). In 1877 it was acquired by the Swan Brewery Company. The brewery buildings constructed in 1879 on the Swan River foreshore beneath Mount Eliza became one of Perth's dominant and favourite landmarks. It was surrounded by a complex of other buildings which have since been demolished or redeveloped. The car-park building on the opposite side of Mount's Bay Road replaced the historic stables which caught fire and were demolished in 1988. Nevertheless, the state's Heritage Council noted that, prior to redevelopment,

The place contains, albeit partially demolished, the finest connected group of late-Victorian and early 20th-century brewery buildings in Australia in a red brick and tile Federation style idiom.

=== 1989–90 protest against redevelopment ===
In 1989, the Western Australian state government vested the site in the building company Multiplex for a peppercorn rental, with a view to its being redeveloped as a commercial precinct. Perth's Noongar community reminded the state government of the site's ancient and sacred Indigenous Australian significance, and established a protest camp on the site, while challenging the issue at law and seeking to have the land reclassified as a public reserve. They were opposed by a Brewery Preservation Group which argued the indisputable heritage value of at least the 1879 industrial building. The developers argued that the brewery had been built on land reclaimed from the Swan River and, therefore, the site of Noongar heritage importance was further inland, close to the Mount Eliza escarpment and the fresh water spring known as Kennedy's Fountain. Ultimately the protest was unsuccessful and the development of the property went ahead. The on-site protest had endured for many months and culminated in a bitter but non-violent confrontation with police on 8 January 1990 at which several arrests were made. In August 1992, police had to break through picket lines to allow development work to proceed.

=== Usage after redevelopment ===
The renovated 1879 building contains a cafe/restaurant and function centre which re-opened in 2001. It also contains a microbrewery which produces malt ales and lagers. There is also a display of historic photographs and artefacts. The site's 28 apartments are privately owned. In 2019, Fiveight, the property investment arm of Tattarang, acquired the lease for the Old Swan Brewery from Besen Family Office. The site became the headquarters of Tattarang and Andrew Forrest's Minderoo Foundation.

== Canning Vale ==
The brewery operation was relocated to a large, fully automated factory at Canning Vale in 1978 where it produced local brands such as Swan and Emu, as well as external brands Tooheys and Hahn. It had its own railway spur constructed, where beer was loaded for transport to the Eastern Goldfields. The Canning Vale complex was officially opened by the then Premier, Sir Charles Court in March 1979. During the mid-1980s, the company became part of the empire of the failed tycoon Alan Bond. It was then acquired by Lion Nathan, a multinational brewing concern distributing many different beers in the Asia-Pacific area. Products that were historically Swan brands include Swan Lager, Emu Bitter and Emu Export. In 2012 Lion Nathan announced that it would cease its brewing operations in Canning Vale and transfer production interstate. The 39-hectare (96-acre) site was developed by Linc Property (which then merged with Fini Group to form Hesperia), in co-venture with Lion Nathan into an industrial land precinct. Known as the Swan Brewery Industrial Estate, the final stage has sold out.

== Beers ==
=== Current production ===
- Swan Draught, also known as "Super", is a mild lager, with a medium bitter flavour and a full body (4.4% alc/vol). It has been in production since 1857.
- Emu Bitter is a lager (4.0% alc/vol). The recipe has not changed, except for alc/vol since it was first launched in 1923.
- Emu Export is a medium bittered (4.2% alc/vol) and full bodied lager. It was first launched in 1954 by Swan Brewery.
- Emu Draft is a mid-strength lager (3.0% alc/vol). It has been in production since 1992.

=== Former production labels ===
- Swan Stout, a unique stout naturally brewed using a centuries-old brewing style (7.4% alc/vol).
- Swan Export Lager: production commenced in 1933.
- Swan Gold was a mid-strength lager, with a small head and moderate bitterness (3.5% alc/vol). Production commenced in 1978 and ceased 2003.
- Swan Premium Lager was released following Australia's success in the America's Cup in 1983.
- Swan Special Light was a fully brewed low alcohol (0.9%) beer released in July 1984.
- Swan Skol was brewed under licence.
- Phipson's Australian Pilsner was produced by Swan Brewery for export in the late 1930s and continued into the 1940s.
- Hannan's Lager was originally brewed in Kalgoorlie.
- 1857 Bitter is a mid-strength lager (3.5% alc/vol). Production commenced in March 1996.

== See also ==
- List of breweries in Australia
- Fairclough v Swan Brewery Co Ltd
