= Kalgoorlie Brewing and Ice Company =

Brewing company founded in Kalgoorlie, Western Australia

- Industry: Alcoholic beverage
- Founded: 1896
- Defunct: 1945
- Successor: Kalgoorlie Brewing Company
- Headquarters: Kalgoorlie, Western Australia, Australia
- Products: Beer
- Owner: Swan Brewery

The Kalgoorlie Brewing and Ice Company opened in 1896 in Kalgoorlie, Western Australia and traded successfully until 1943, when it was taken over by the Swan Brewery, and its name was simplified to Kalgoorlie Brewing Company. The Brewery, known locally as the 'Big K', located at Porter Street, Kalgoorlie, was the last survivor of nineteen breweries that once traded in the Eastern Goldfields.

== History ==
The company was floated on 24 February 1896, with capital of £12,000. The first chairman was Robert McKenzie (MLC) and his fellow directors were James Hurtle Cummins, S. Hocking and John Joseph Dwyer. The first general manager and brewer, was J. H. Shickel(a German brewer and the proprietor of the Caledonian Brewery in South Australia). The brewery was the second brewery to be established in the Western Australian goldfields, with the first beers produced in September 1896. Following the death of Shickel of pneumonia in June 1897, the company appointed William Elliott as their brewer. Alfred Deakin subsequently replaced Elliott as the company's brewer in January 1900, a position he held for over forty years. Cummins was subsequently appointed Managing Director in 1904. In 1912 the company purchased the Lion Brewery in Coolgardie, followed by the Langsford Brewery in 1918 and Union Brewery in 1919. The headquarters of the brewery were then moved from Porter Street to the former Union Brewery's buildings in Brookman Street. In 1920 the company purchased the Boulder City Brewery. By 1924 the company had taken over all the rival breweries in the goldfields area.

James Cummins' daughter, Alice Mary Cummins, although educated as a lawyer, began working at her father's Kalgoorlie Brewing and Ice Company Ltd as a cash ledgerkeeper in 1928. She proceeded to learn and master all aspects of the brewing business from the technical, engineering, refrigeration through to marketing. Alice Cummins then set about re-establishing the business. In 1929 the company established a second brewery in the wheatbelt town of Merredin. Cummins made her director of the Merredin brewery. In the early 1930s Alice urged her father to turn from the production of English-style beer and introduce the top-fermentation process of German lager.

When James Cummins died in London on 19 March 1936, of acute peritonitis, Alice became managing director and the major shareholder of his enterprises. With support for the old-style beer flagging, rival breweries expanding and hotels being progressively 'tied' by competitors, her situation was critical. Undaunted, she installed new plant and equipment at a cost of £125,000 (increasing the brewery's output and storage capacity), and boosted the company's outlets by acquiring hotels for the company and in her own right at Kalgoorlie, Merredin, Moorine Rock, Sandstone, Boyanup, Tammin, Yellowdine, Wagin and Meckering. She triumphed when the instant popularity of Hannan's Lager in September 1937 was reflected in its escalating consumption figures. In the 1940s she repeatedly fought off numerous takeover bids by the Swan Brewery.

Alice Cummins died of a heart attack on 27 June 1943. In February 1945 the executors of her estate agreed to sell her 83% shareholding in the Kalgoorlie Brewing and Ice Company to the Swan Brewery for £200,000. The existing brewing operations continued in Kalgoorlie and Merredin, with the Swan Brewery being represented on the board.

On 5 September 1981 Alan Bond, through his company, Bond Corporation, made a $150 million offer for the Swan Brewery. On 26 October 1981 Bond Corporation triumphantly declared that the take-over had succeeded. The assets of the Swan Brewery included the subsidiary ‘Kalgoorlie Brewing Co’. On 21 November 1982, just 12 months after the takeover, the Kalgoorlie Brewery ceased operations and the brewery was dismantled.

== Beers ==
- Hannan's Lager
- Kalgoorlie Stout
- K Prize Ale
- K Extra Stout
- Westland Lager
- King Lager
- Kalgoorlie Bitter
- Oatmeal Stout

== See also ==
- List of breweries in Australia
- List of ice companies
- Swan Brewery
