= Akubra =

Australian hat manufacturer

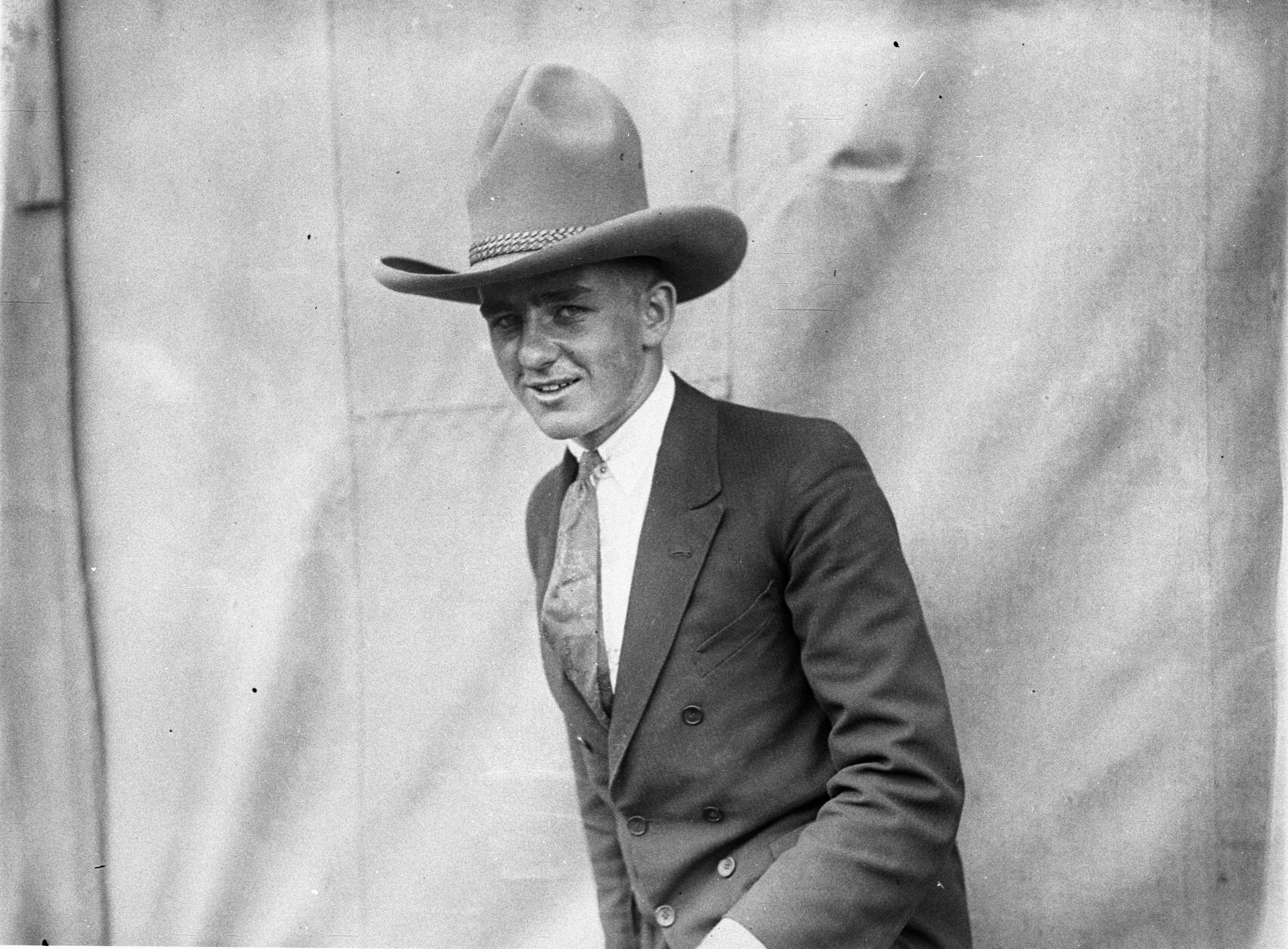
- Type: Private
- Industry: Headware, clothing
- Founded: 1876; 150 years ago
- Founder: Benjamin Dunkerley
- Headquarters: Kempsey, New South Wales, Australia
- Owner: Tattarang
- Website: akubra.com.au

Akubra /əˈkuːbrə/ is an Australian hat manufacturer owned by Tattarang since November 2023. The company is associated with bush hats made of rabbit fur felt with wide brims that are worn in rural Australia. The term "Akubra" is sometimes used to refer to any hat of this kind, however the company manufactures a wide range of hat styles including fedora, homburg, bowler, pork pie, and trilby.

The name is claimed to derive from an Aboriginal (possibly Birpai) word for a head covering.

== History ==
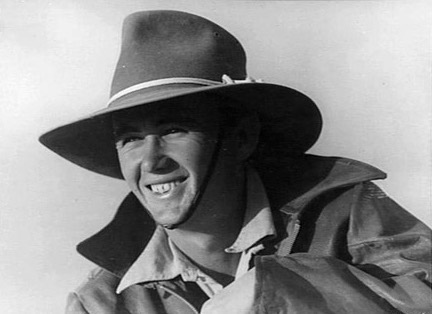
A man wearing an Akubra wide-brimmed hat

Benjamin Dunkerley was born 1840 in Cheshire England. He came from a family of cotton weavers. He later became a hatter and developed such skill with hat making machinery that he visited Germany from time to time to help manufacturers there set up operations. In 1874 Benjamin left England for Tasmania, Australia to check out the hatting prospects. Once immigrated and established in Australia, he sent for his wife Harriet and six children to join him.

In 1876 Dunkerley and David Gledhill established the Kensington Hat Mills in Glenorchy, near Hobart in Tasmania. The business rapidly expanded and was soon employing 30 workers and producing 750 hats per week. However, the business was declared bankrupt in 1879. Once the restrictions on his bankruptcy were lifted, Dunkerley in 1885 re-established Kensington Hat Mills in partnership with H.J Hull. To improve production, Dunkerley invented and registered in 1892 a fur-cutting machine that mechanised the difficult and tedious task of stripping the fur from the skin of rabbits. Realising its potential, he travelled to Manchester in England and took out a patent, which after some delay he was granted in August 1893. During the wait he travelled to New York and filed for a US patent and also sent an application back to Victoria, Australia. He was successful, being granted in all three countries.

Later in that year of 1893 in partnership with James Dugdale, he took out another patent in England, for an invention that improved cones employed in making hat bodies.

Ending his partnership with Hull after a decade working together, Dunkerley relocated to Melbourne in 1895. When a business slump hit the city in 1900, he moved to Sydney, setting up a hat making factory on 556 Crown Street in Surry Hills.

In 1901 Stephen Keir (14 October 1879 – 11 November 1957), who came from a family of Manchester hatmakers, immigrated to Australia and after working for another hatmaker, entered the employment of Dunkerley in 1904 where he became romantically involved with Benjamin's daughter Ada Dunkerley, who also worked in the factory. They married in 1905.

While information is missing on what Dunkerley was calling his business in Melbourne and Sydney, in 1911 Dunkerley Hat Mills Pty Ltd was registered with seven shareholders, 19 employees with Stephen Keir as managing director and Arthur P. Stewart as chairman.

Dunkerley Mills in Bourke st Waterloo

All of the hats that were produced at the factory in Bourke st Waterloo NSW and sold through retailers in the city. The office was registered at 129 York Street in Sydney.

On 7 August 1912 Stewart, who, as well as being a shareholder in the company and its chairman, was the distributor and sales agent for the company, registered the name Akubra as trademark 13462. Since then, it has been using Akubra as a brand name.

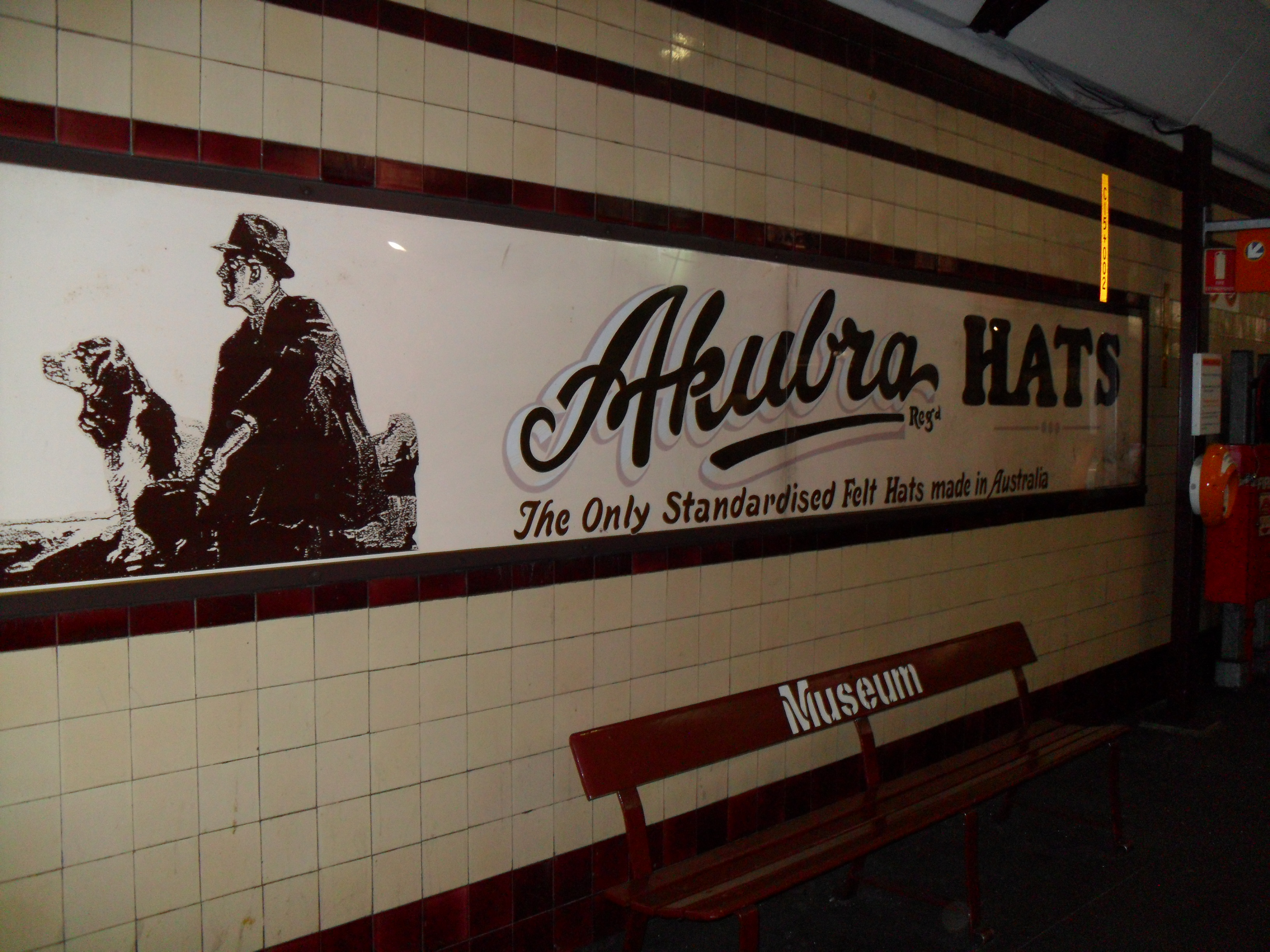
Akubra heritage poster, Museum railway station

During World War I the company manufactured slouch hats for the Australian army. Slouch hats made of rabbit fur were found to be more hard wearing than the hats made from previous woollen felt. Since then it has continued supplying slouch hats to the Australian armed forces with an estimated over two million produced by 2016.

In 1919 the company moved from its existing cramped and poorly located factory to new bigger premises at Bourke Street, Sydney.

By the 1920s the company had hundreds of employees. When the Depression struck and the demand for hats collapsed Keir's proposal (democratically endorsed) of a 10 per cent wage cut for all employees avoided any reduction in numbers.

With the outbreak of World War II the business revived as most of the company's production was directed into making slouch hats for the military. Those employees who enlisted had their normal civilian wages preserved by the company to augment their military pay.

In the 1950s, the Akubra Company expanded its range when it won the licence to produce Stetson hats in Australia. In 1972, Mainline Corporation acquired Dunkerley Hat Mills maker of the Aussie Icon Akubra Hats and in 1974 the business was relocated from Sydney to larger premises in Kempsey.

When Stephen Keir retired in 1952 he was succeeded as Managing Director by his eldest son, Herbert. His second son, Stephen Keir II, served as General Manager and succeeded his brother as Managing Director in 1972. His son, Stephen Keir III, became Managing Director in 1980. Following the retirement of Stephen Keir III in 2007, his son Stephen Keir IV became Managing Director.

In 2015 Akubra renewed its contract with the Australian Defence Force, becoming the sole manufacturer of slouch hats. In the same year Akubra produced its 2 millionth slouch hat.

Akubra was acquired by private investment company Tattarang in November 2023. Former managing director Stephen Keir cited the COVID-19 pandemic as one of the main drivers of the sale.

== Styles ==
Over 100 different styles, various colours and brim widths are produced in the Akubra hat range. The hats are popularly thought of as being worn by older people in rural Australia however in the 1920s Akubra was known more for making "fashion hats" such as Fedoras. The company sells hats in rural and urban areas. In 2014 it was reported that about 140,000 to 180,000 Akubras are sold every year, including "bucket loads" in Melbourne around Melbourne Cup time.

== See also ==
- List of hat styles
- List of oldest companies in Australia
