= Camilla Franks =

Australian fashion designer

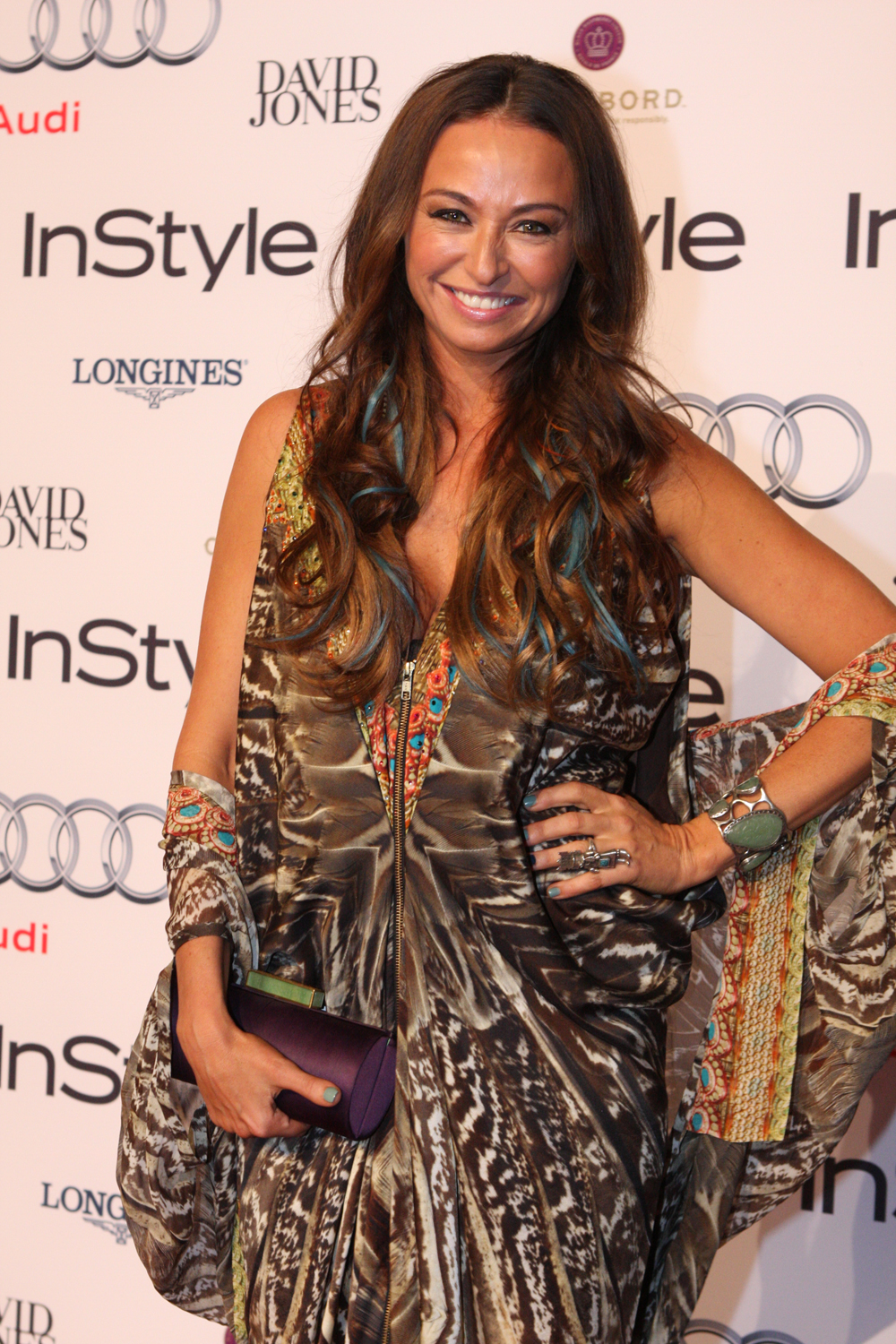
- Camilla Franks in 2013
- Born: 15 March 1976 (age 50); Sydney, Australia
- Occupation: Fashion Designer
- Years active: 2004–present
- Partner: JP Jones
- Children: 1
- Website: camilla.com

Camilla Franks (born 15 March 1976) is an Australian fashion designer, known for her bright kaftan designs and resort-wear.

== Early life ==
Born in Sydney, Franks' mother was a model who ended up as a fashion buyer, and her father was an architect. The family would take summer holidays to Fraser Island where Franks and her brother would swim and catch lizards. Franks' younger brother, Ben, fell to his death at the age of 14 from the top of Watsons Bay's clifftops, leaving Franks grief stricken. Pouring herself into work to try and cope, she tried various careers such as events planning, advertising and then theatre acting. Creating costumes for some of her performances out of old saris and kimonos, her garments garnered praise and started Franks on a path into fashion design.

Franks took her fashion cues from her mother and her grandmother who always wore a kimono, kaftan or a headscarf.

As a teenager, Franks spent a year in London where she first met her now partner, JP Jones.

== Career ==
Inspired by travel and different exotic design techniques, Franks founded fashion brand, Camilla, in 2004 at Bondi Beach in Australia. Within a year, luxury department store David Jones stocked her collection. Known for her luxury bright kaftan designs, her creations have been worn by celebrities such as Oprah Winfrey and Beyoncé. The Camilla brand is now sold around the world and has branched out from creating just kaftans to now include accessories, home-wears and ready-to-wear.

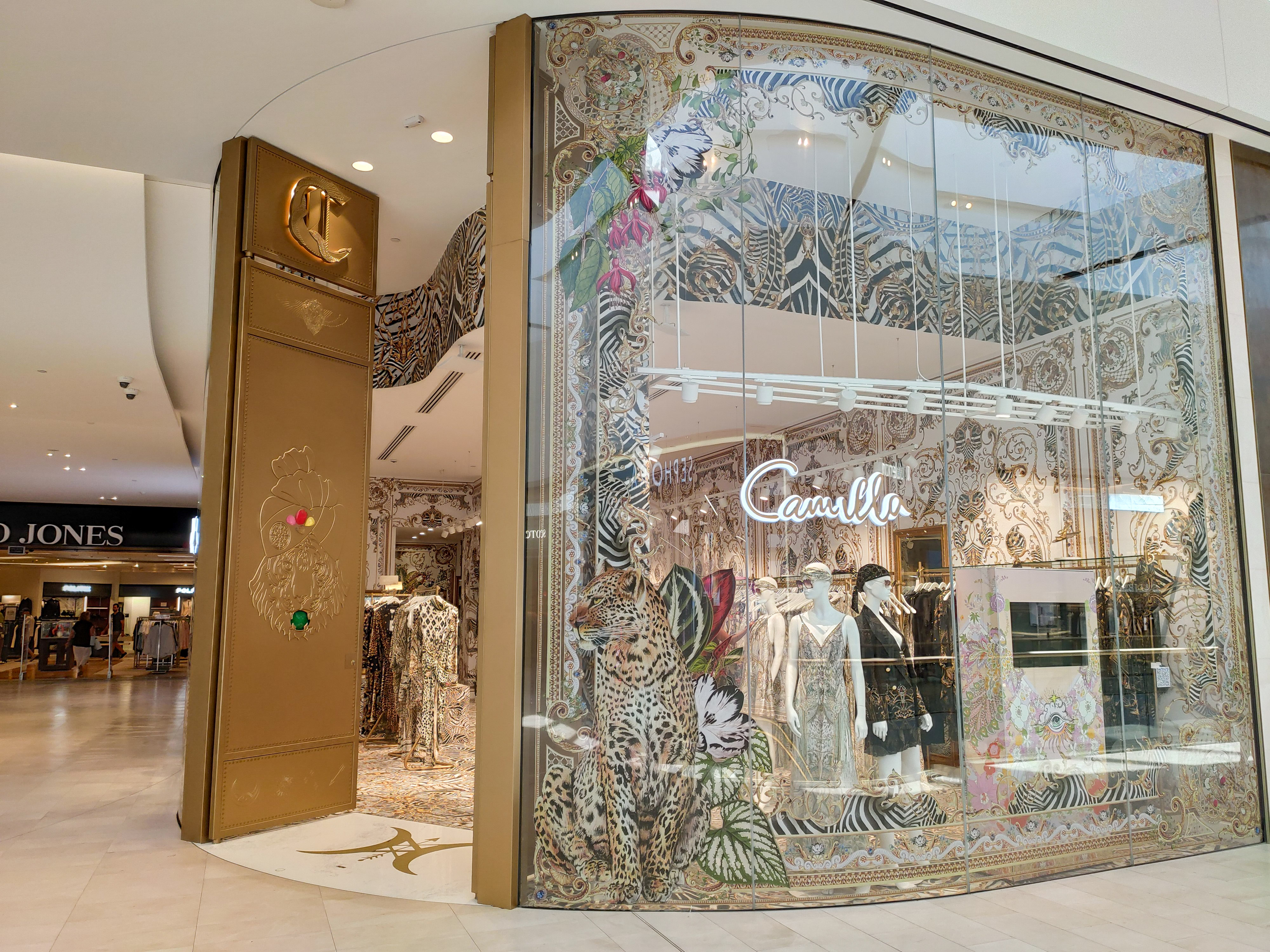
Camilla store in Karrinyup Shopping Centre

The Camilla brand stores have been targeted by a series of robberies over the years. On one occasion, the thieves stole $240,000 worth of garments from the Bondi store. In January 2023, Tattarang took a minority stake in Camilla in a deal reported to be worth around $40 million.

Franks has co-designed ranges and been an ambassador for companies such as Designer Rugs, Linen House, Austral Bricks, Ovvio Organics and Pommery Champagne.

In 2011, Franks was a guest on the TV shows, Beauty and the Geek and Project Runway Australia as a judge. In 2013 Franks was featured in an episode of Australia's Next Top Model.

In 2021, Franks was a contestant on Celebrity Apprentice Australia, and was the ninth to be "fired" in the series.

In 2022, Franks guest starred on the series The White Lotus, she appeared in episode 6 as herself.

== Personal life ==
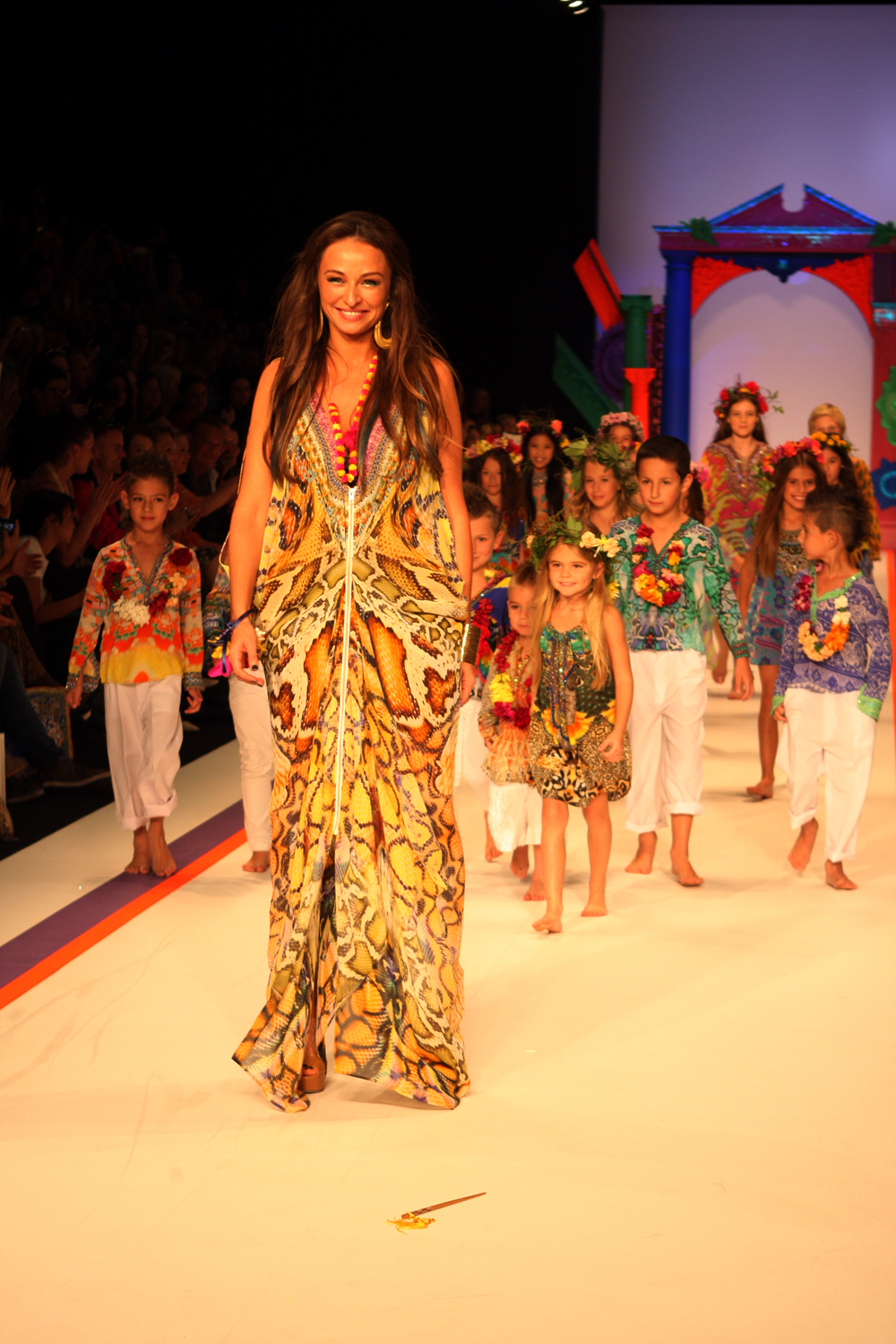
Franks at Mercedes-Benz Fashion Week Australia in 2012

Franks was diagnosed with stage three breast cancer in January 2018, months after she gave birth to her daughter. The cancer required her to have her ovaries removed and she said she wished she had frozen her eggs earlier in life. After a double mastectomy in late 2018, Franks had five unsuccessful rounds of IVF.

Franks became engaged to Welsh artist and musician, JP Jones, in 2016 and the couple planned to marry in 2017 but her cancer diagnosis put that on hold. The couple have known each other for over 25 years, meeting in a club in London.

Australian designer Carla Zampatti is one of Franks' fashion inspirations, alongside Vivienne Westwood and Frida Kahlo.

Franks practices Buddhism. Franks and her family reside in an 1800s Victorian terrace in Woollahra.
