= Emu (beer) =

Australian beer brand

- Emu Export logo
- Manufacturer: Lion; (Kirin)
- Introduced: 1908 by Emu Brewery
- Alcohol by volume: Emu Bitter: 4.0%; Emu Draft: 3.0%; Emu Export: 4.2%
- Style: Australian lager

Emu is a beer brand name owned by Lion. It was originally brewed by the Emu Brewery in 1908, until the brewery's sale to the Swan Brewery in 1927. The production of the Emu branded beer continued from a separate autonomous brewery in Perth until 1978, and then was relocated to a combined brewery in Canning Vale. In 2014 Lion Nathan moved production of both the Emu and Swan beer brands to the company's West End Brewery in Adelaide. Following the closure of the West End Brewery in October 2020, it was announced that Swan and Emu branded beer would be brewed at either the Castlemaine Perkins brewery in Brisbane or Tooheys Brewery in Sydney.

== Varieties ==
=== Emu Bitter ===
Emu Bitter logo

Emu Bitter is a mild bitter Australian lager that has a strong hops taste, which was introduced in 1923 as one of Swan Brewing Company's flagships. The alcohol by volume content of the beer is currently 4.0%.

The man pictured on the label is former Swan Brewer Ken Arrowsmith. He oversaw the introduction of Emu Draft and was head brewer during the brands popularity boom in the late 1980s and into the 1990s. Colloquial names for the beer include "bush chook", "EB" and "Kenny".

=== Emu Draft ===
Emu Draft is a mid-strength distinctively rich amber coloured lager that was introduced in 1992. The current alcohol content is 3.0%.

=== Emu Export ===
Emu Export is a clean light yellow lager that was first launched in 1954 with an alcohol content of 4.9%. The current alcohol volume has been reduced to 4.2%.

Colloquial names for the beer include: "the red lead", "the red death", "flightless bird", "export", "sport", "E squared", "chook's piss", "bush chook", "wife basher", "red can", "sexport", "red hand grenade", "RTS" (red tin sychosis [sic]).

== Emu Brewery ==
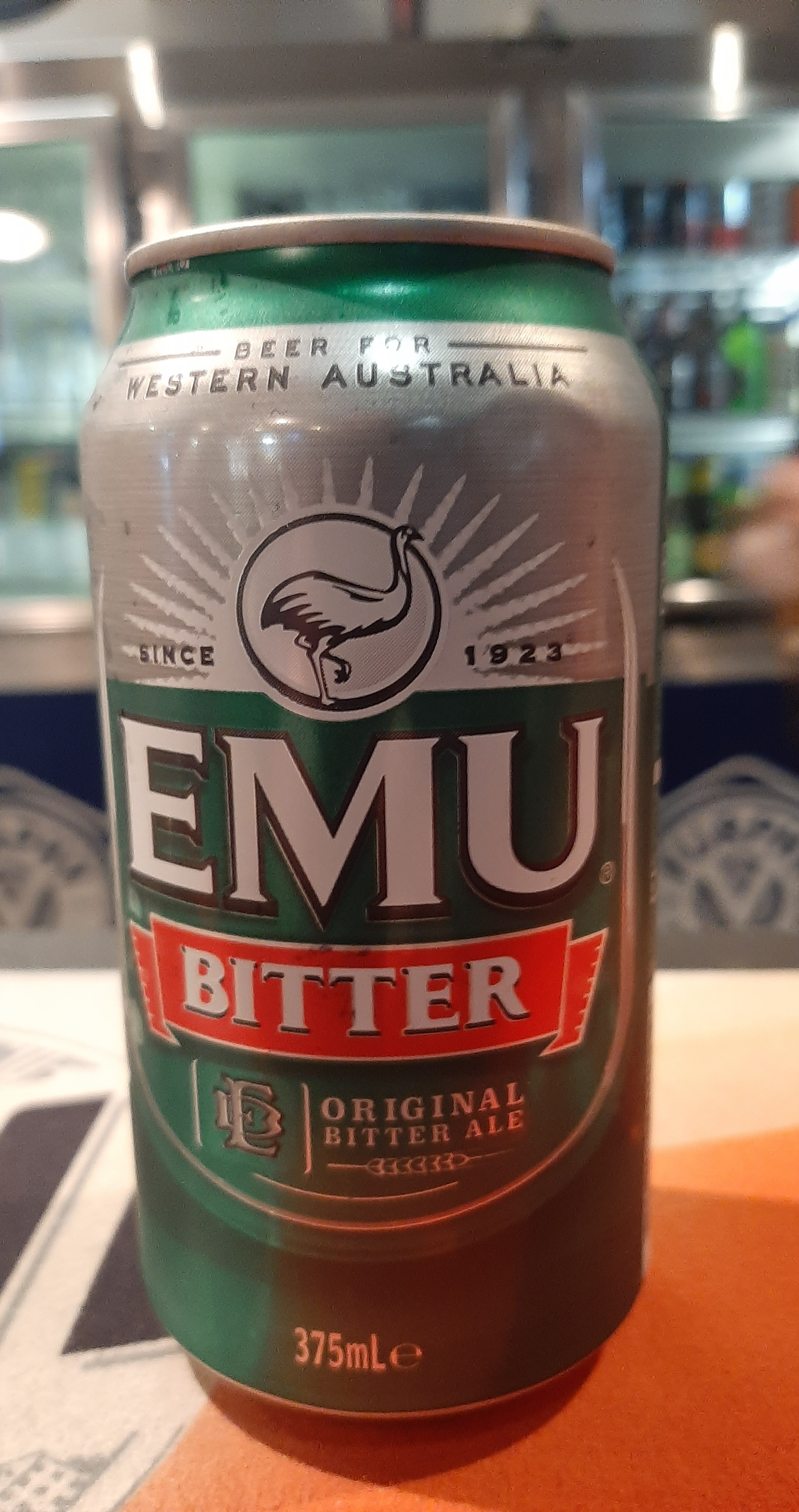
Emu Bitter can, 375 millilitres (12.7 US fl oz). Alcohol content by volume, 4%

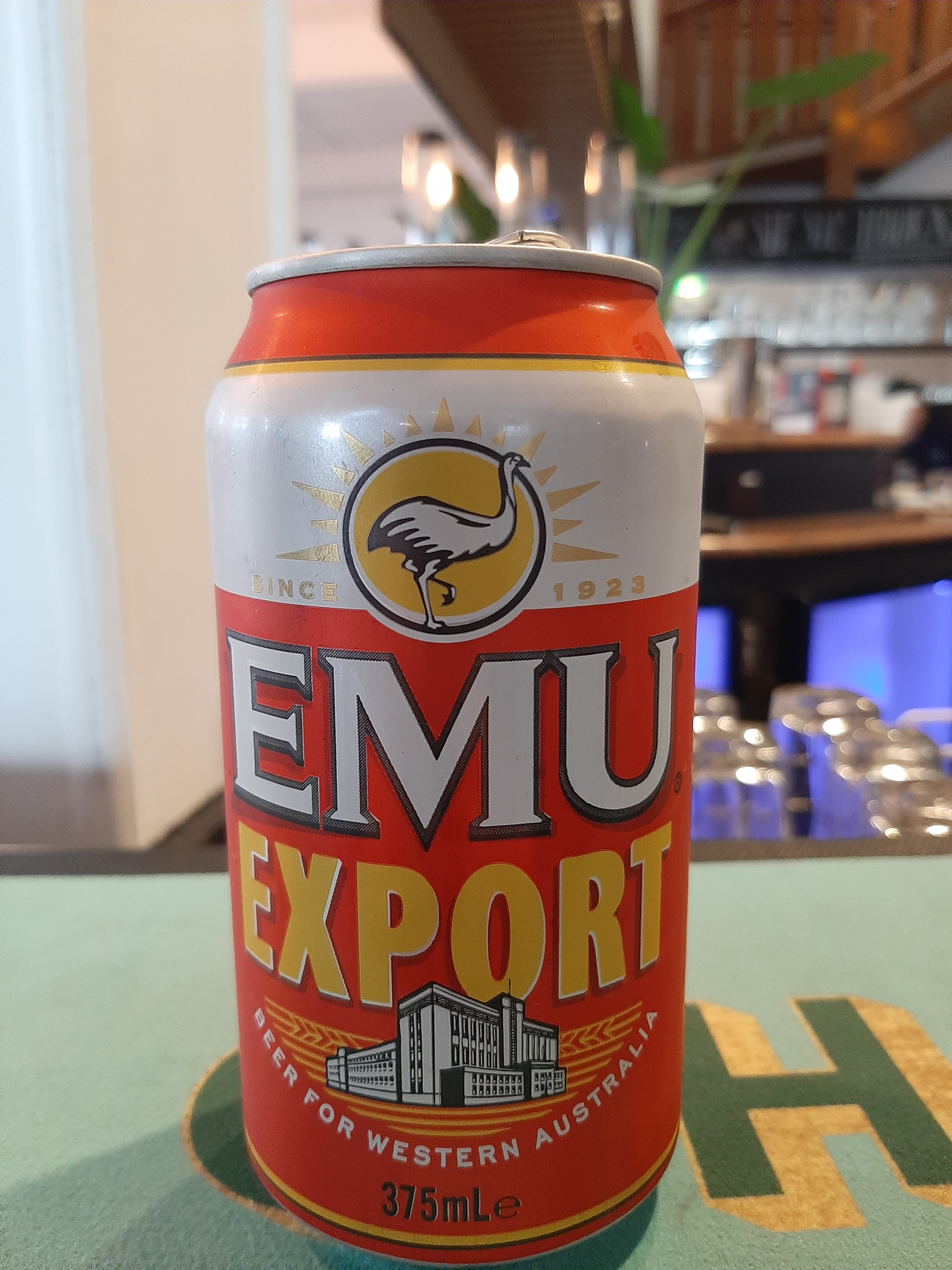
Emu Export can, 375 millilitres (12.7 US fl oz). Alcohol content by volume, 4.2%

Emu beer originated from the Stanley Brewery (previously the Albion Brewery) which was established by James Stokes, a 27-year-old settler from Bristol, England. Built in 1848 at the foot of Mount Eliza, the brewery's name was later changed to Emu Brewery to better identify with its popular Emu bottled beer. In 1927 Swan Brewery acquired control of what was then its major competitor – the Emu Brewery.

Because of the popularity of the Emu bottled beer, Swan decided to expand and modernise the Emu Brewery and to run it as a separate concern rather than amalgamate it with Swan's other lines. As a result, and even in relatively modern times, the Emu brand had a namesake brewery.

The last "Emu Brewery" stood at the corner of Spring Street and Mounts Bay Road at the western end of the Perth CBD. The Art Deco building, designed by architects Oldham, Boas and Ednie-Brown in 1937, (Note: Oldham, Boas and Ednie-Brown also designed London Court (in 1936).) featured large interesting and attractive stone motives of brewing activities created by Western Australian sculptor Edward F. Kohler. The building was considered one of the more attractive buildings operated by the Swan Brewery company and a star example of the Perth Art Deco architectural era. Swan were proud enough of the building to feature a picture of it on the label of their bottles and cans of Emu Export Lager.

Once this last "Emu Brewery" was closed, proposed redevelopment of the site became a controversial issue as it was overlooked by the Government of Western Australia. The site remained empty and abandoned for many years and was the target for vandalism and graffiti. Despite a heritage listing, the site consequently became run down and the brewery building was demolished from late 1991 to early 1992.

== See also ==
- Beer in Australia
- List of breweries in Australia

== General references ==
- Emu Draft - launch of the Swan Brewery new beer called Emu Draft or affectionately known as "The Red Death" Western liquor guide, April 1992, p. 18
