= Fairclough v Swan Brewery Co Ltd =

- Court: Privy Council
- Decided: 17 May 1912
- Citations: [1912] UKPC 1, [1912] AC 565

Case history
- Prior actions: Swan Brewery Co Ltd v Fairclough [1911] WALawRp 3, (1911) 13 WALR 72
- Appealed from: Supreme Court (Full Court) WA

Court membership
- Judges sitting: Lord Macnaghten, Lord Atkinson, Lord Shaw, Lord Mersey

Keywords
- Mortgage

Fairclough v Swan Brewery Co Ltd, is a land law case, in which the Privy Council held that restrictions on the right to redeem a mortgage are void. The equity of redemption means that borrowers are able to sell or obtain new mortgage finance promptly and without impinging on other dependent transactions.

== Background ==
A person who borrows money that is secured against an interest in land (the mortgagor) has a right to redeem the mortgage on repayment of the principal (sum) (plus interest if required by the deed and permitted by the law, such as in a commercial agreement, plus any arrears). This right was enforced by courts of equity and is the equity of redemption. Courts of equity would not permit restrictions on this right, and "[a]ny provision inserted to prevent redemption on payment or performance of the debt or obligation for which the security was given, is what is meant by a clog or fetter upon the equity of redemption and is therefore void". It means a person can sell land promptly, or obtain a new mortgage promptly.

=== Facts ===
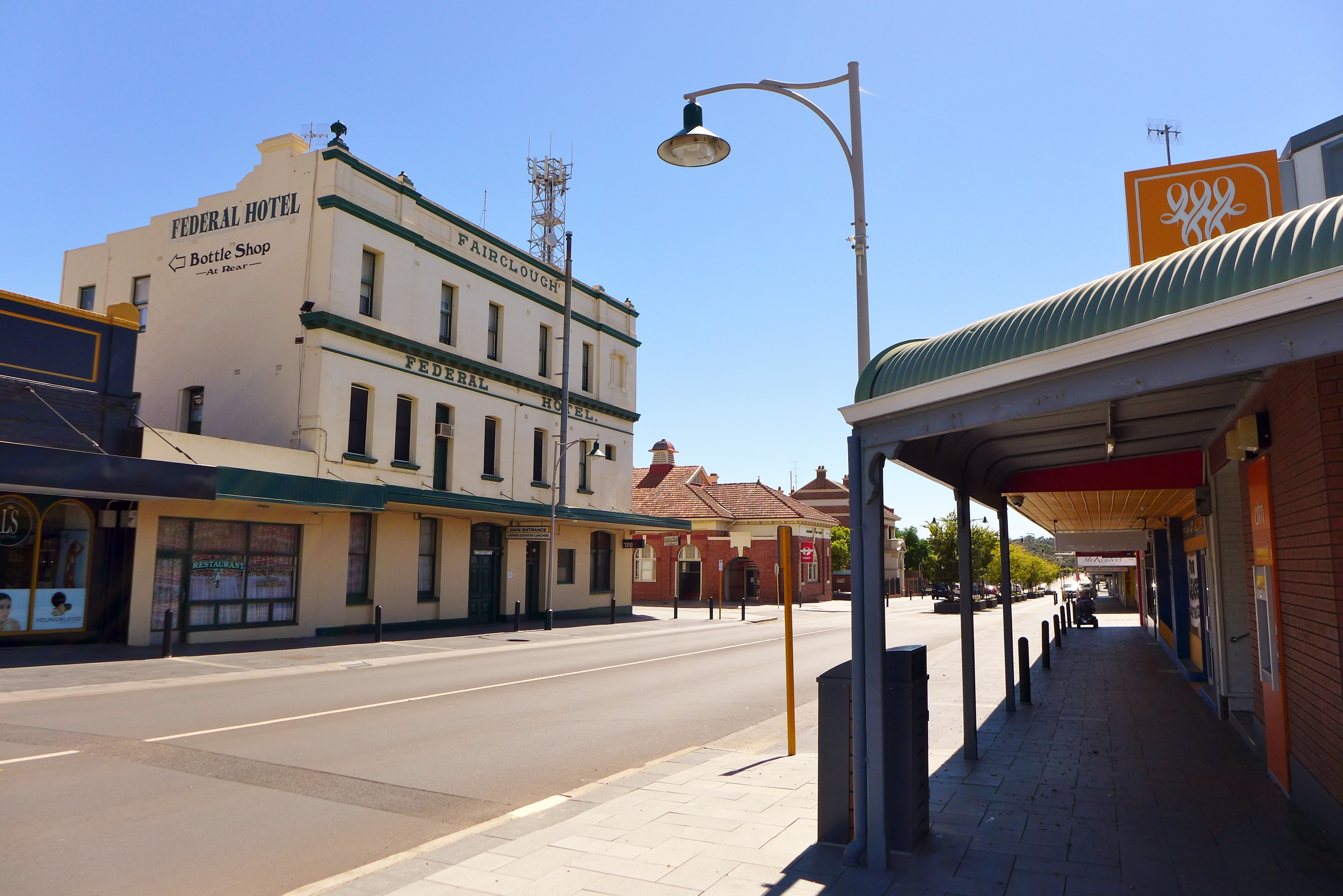
The Federal Hotel, Katanning, 2018

A person entered into a 20-year lease of the Federal Hotel in Katanning, Western Australia in June 1905 and Fairclough purchased the unexpired term of (actual possession not landlord's reversion of) the lease in 1907. Fairclough borrowed £500 from the Swan Brewery Co Ltd, repayable in monthly instalments until May 1925(the rest of the term of the lease less 35 days). The mortgage stated that:

1. Fairclough could not pay out the loan early without the consent of the Swan Brewery; and
2. an exclusive dealing clause that Fairclough would only purchase beer from the Swan Brewery.

The effect of being tied to the Swan Brewery was that Fairclough could only get a discount of 5% on the price of beer, while a free house could get a 12.5% discount. In late 1909 the Swan Brewery was having difficulty supplying enough beer due to a shortage of casks. Fairclough commenced selling beer from other breweries and in January 1910 sought to repay the debt plus the agreed interest. The Swan Brewery did not consent and insisted that the debt could not be repaid until May 1925.

=== Prior actions ===
The Swan Brewery commenced proceedings in the Supreme Court of Western Australia seeking to enforce the exclusive dealing clause and Fairclough made a cross claim seeking equitable relief against the mortgage and damages for the Swan Brewery failing to supply enough beer. Fairclough's damages claim for failing to supply enough beer was settled for £75. McMillan J held that Fairclough did not need to borrow the £500 but that the Swan Brewery had insisted upon it in order to make sure that the Federal Hotel sold beer exclusively from the Swan Brewery. As there was no mutual benefit for the term of 17.5 years, Fairclough had a right to redeem the mortgage. The Swan Brewery were entitled to damages of £8 for the few weeks between when Fairclough started selling beer from other breweries and when he sought to redeem the mortgage.

The Swan Brewery appealed to the Full Court of the Supreme Court. Parker CJ, Burnside and Rooth JJ allowed the appeal, finding that a mortgagor was only entitled to redeem a mortgage only after discharge of all the obligations under the mortgage, which included the exclusive dealing clause. This was a bargain freely entered into, with no question of fraud, duress or unfair dealing. The exclusive dealing clause was a collateral advantage that the Swan Brewery was able to obtain and enforce. Fairclough appealed to the Privy Council.

== Judgment ==
The advice of the Privy Council was delivered by Lord Macnaghten, (Note: At the time there was no provision for dissent or separate judgments in the Privy Council. Instead the advice to the King was determined by a majority of judges who heard the appeal and one judge would be chosen to write the judgment. Decisions of the Privy Council tended to be expressed on narrow grounds, a tendency attributed to the need to reflect the agreement of the majority of judges.) which held that there was a broad rule that the right of redemption could not be hampered or crippled, noting that "The rule in comparatively recent times was unsettled by certain decisions in the Court of Chancery in England which seem to have misled the learned Judges in the Full Court. But it is now firmly established by the House of Lords that the old rule still prevails and that equity will not permit any device or contrivance being part of the mortgage transaction or contemporaneous with it to prevent or impede redemption." A mortgage cannot be made irredeemable and in this case the provision for redemption was nugatory in that it could only be done at a time when the lease was at the point of expiring.

== Collateral advantages ==
The House of Lords later held in Kreglinger v New Patagonia Meat and Cold Storage Co Ltd, that collateral advantages in a mortgage could be and could only be upheld if they are "not either (1) unfair and unconscionable, or (2) in the nature of the penalty clogging the equity of redemption or (3) inconsistent with or repugnant to the contractual and equitable right to redeem,"

There has been some judicial debate in Australia as to the status of the decision in Fairclough v Swan Brewery Co Ltd. Fairclough v Swan Brewery Co Ltd has been cited by the High Court, though not in a way essential to the decision. The Supreme Court of NSW has twice held that while the High Court was bound by the decision at the time it was delivered, the High Court was no longer bound by decisions of the Privy Council nor the Supreme Court of NSW and that there was "no reason why ... the courts should not rid us of this vestigial rule". This approach has been rejected in the Supreme Court of Queensland, where it was held that "[g]iven the long established authority on which the traditional approach is based, and its support in the seriously considered dicta of the High Court it should be followed by courts below the High Court".

=== Exclusive dealing ===
In Australia, most types of exclusive dealing are against the law only when they substantially lessen competition.

== See also ==
- English land law
- Mortgage law
- English property law
