= Tattarang =

Australian private investment company

- Formerly: Minderoo Group (2001–2020)
- Type: Privately held company
- Founded: 2001; 25 years ago
- Headquarters: Perth, Australia
- Owner: Andrew Forrest; Nicola Forrest
- Website: tattarang.com

Tattarang is an Australian private investment company owned by Andrew Forrest and his family. Tattarang invests in a diverse range of businesses across agri-food, energy, health technology, property, resources, and lifestyle. The group is made up of six business divisions: Fiveight, Harvest Road, Squadron Energy, Tenmile, Wyloo and Z1Z.

Tattarang was previously known as Minderoo Group until May 2020 when the company was rebranded. The name is a tribute to a stallion owned by Forrest’s mother at the family’s Minderoo Station during the 1950s.

== Divisions ==
=== Harvest Road ===
Harvest Road concentrate on three core areas: meat, aquaculture and plant based. As of March 2022, Forrest owns the agribusiness Harvest Road, which deals in beef and seafood, with a focus on ethically and sustainably produced food. Harvest Road owns the brands Harvey Beef, Leeuwin Coast, and Ernest Green and Sons.

Forrest acquired meat processing company Harvey Beef in May 2014 for A$40 million. The biggest exporter of beef in Western Australia, it was until August 2014 the only one accredited to export to China.

=== Squadron Energy ===
Squadron Energy is an Australian resources company focused on projects in natural resources and renewable energy.

Squadron acquired 75 percent of wind farm developer Windlab in June 2020. Ownership of Windlabs' Wongalee and Prairie projects were transferred to Fortescue Future Industries in February 2024.

In March 2022 Forrest, via Squadron, along with Atlassian co-founder Mike Cannon-Brookes, together invested A$210 million in the Australia-Asia Power Link project, which is backed by the Australian-Singaporean company Sun Cable. It includes the construction of a solar and battery farm 12,000 hectares (120 km^{2}) in size at Powell Creek, Northern Territory, and a power cable to link it to Singapore (via Indonesia), leaving Australia at Murrumujuk Beach. Transmission was planned to start in 2026. However, Sun Cable went into administration in January 2023 owing to disagreements between Forrest and Cannon-Brookes, and when put up for sale, both Squadron and Cannon-Brookes' company Grok Ventures put in bids for it by May 2023.

In December 2022, Squadron acquired CWP Renewables, an Australian developer and owner of renewable energy systems, for over $4 billion.

=== Wyloo ===
Wyloo is Tattarang's mining division. In December 2020, Wyloo acquired a near 38 percent stake in Canadian nickel mining company Noront Resources for US$26.5 million. In December 2021, Wyloo announced it would acquire Noront after BHP dropped out of the ensuing takeover battle. The acquisition was completed in April 2022 and Noront was renamed Ring of Fire Metals in September 2022 after the region in Ontario.

Wyloo began acquiring shares in mining company Western Areas in March 2021, reaching a 9.14 percent stake in January 2022. When IGO made a takeover offer for Western Areas in December 2021, Wyloo emerged as a potential rival bidder or disruptor of the deal. In February 2022, Wyloo and IGO struck a peace deal under which Wyloo would support IGO's bid and the two companies would form a joint venture to investigate and, if economically feasible, advance development of a downstream nickel processing facility in WA. In April 2023, the Government of Western Australia allocated land in Kwinana Beach for the refinery, and Wyloo and IGO announced they were looking into integrating a plant producing precursor cathode active material at the proposed refinery. A final investment decision is due in 2024.

As of August 2021, Wyloo held a 12 percent stake in Poseidon Nickel and just under 5 percent of nickel producer Panoramic Resources. In January 2022, it reduced its stake in Poseidon to under 5 percent.

In August 2022, Wyloo made a A$150 million cornerstone investment in West Australian rare earths developer Hastings Technology Metals. The investment allowed Hastings to purchase a 22 percent stake in Canadian magnet maker Neo Performance Materials.

On 21 March 2023, Wyloo made a A$760 million takeover bid for nickel miner Mincor Resources. Wyloo at the time already held a 19.99 percent stake in Mincor. The acquisition was completed in July 2023.

=== Fiveight ===
Fiveight invests in, develops and manages residential, commercial and industrial property. On 29 April 2022 it was announced that Fiveight bought the Carillon City centre for AU$80 million. Fiveight owns Cottesloe’s Indiana Teahouse, East Perth Power Station and 190 St Georges Terrace, all of which it plans to redevelop. In February 2023, Fiveight acquired the Waldorf Astoria Sydney, a hotel in development in Circular Quay, for around A$520 million.

=== Z1Z ===
Z1Z is Tattarang's hospitality and lifestyle arm. It operates the luxury Gaia spa in Byron Bay, Cape Lodge hotel in Margaret River, and restaurants Cooee at the Old Swan Brewery and Indigo Oscar at Indiana Teahouse.

=== Tenmile ===
Tenmile is a venture capital firm which invests in health technology companies and solutions delivering life-changing ideas and better health outcomes. It launched in August 2022 with a $250 million fund. It is named after a pool of water on the Ashburton River.

== Other businesses and stakes ==
=== R. M. Williams ===
Tattarang purchased footwear and clothing company RM Williams in 2020 from Hong Kong based owner L Catterton. The (originally Australian) company had been partly owned by French luxury brand conglomerate LVMH since 2013. The company was purchased for $190 million. Around 35 per cent of RM Williams' manufacturing is done offshore, and Forrest has said he will return this part of the business's manufacture to Australia.

=== Akubra ===
Tattarang acquired Australian hatmaker Akubra in November 2023.

=== SFM Marine ===
SFM Marine is a maritime services company owned by Tattarang after it acquired Northport Marine Services in 2020 and rebranded it. In 2021, SFM Marine acquired Henderson-based company The Boat Business.

=== Stakes in other companies ===
Tattarang holds 734 million shares in Fortescue, valued at about A$16 billion, as of July 2023. The company holds a 19.3 percent stake in WA-based shipbuilder Austal, a 18.5 percent stake in cattle and beef producer Australian Agricultural Company, and a 11.5 percent stake in food and drinks company Bega Group. In July 2022, Tattarang increased its stake in beauty company BWX Group to 19.9 percent. In January 2023, Tattarang took a minority stake in Australian fashion brand Camilla in a deal reported to be worth around $40 million.

== Ukraine Green Growth Initiative ==
In 2022, Andrew Forrest stated that he will invest $740 million in businesses in Ukraine to help their economy recover. This investment fund will focus on primary infrastructure such as energy and communications to build a digital green grid, so Ukraine can become a model for the world as a leading digital green economy.

== Company affairs ==
John Hartman was appointed CEO of Tattarang in October 2022, replacing Andrew Hagger who was CEO since 2019. Luca Giacovazzi is CEO of Wyloo. Jason Willoughby has been CEO at Squadron Energy since January 2023, taking over from Eva Hanly who was CEO since July 2022. Joost Heymeijer has been CEO of Z1Z since June 2022. Paige Walker will commence her role as the inaugural CEO of Fiveight in July 2023.

The company has been headquartered at the Old Swan Brewery since April 2020. It previously operated out of the former Sunset Hospital site in Dalkeith.
