= List of sporting goods manufacturers =

This article lists notable manufacturers of sporting goods.

== Brands ==
Sports kit manufacturers
Manufacturer	Country	Founded	Founder(s)	Key people	Products	Headquarters	Total assets	Website
Adidas	Germany	18 August 1949	Adolf Dassler	Igor Landau, Chairman; Bjørn Gulden, CEO	Sportswear, sports equipment, toiletries, clothing & accessories	Herzogenaurach, Germany	€5.489 billion (2012)	www.adidas-group.com
Admiral	United Kingdom	1914	Cristopher Cook & Harold Hurst		Sportswear, footwear, accessories	Manchester, England, U.K.		admiralsportswear.com
Alanic	United States	2011	Dioz Group		Clothing	California		https://www.alanic.clothing/
Alcocks	Australia	1853	Henry Upton Alcock		Billiard tables Billiard balls Cue sticks Racks	Malvern East, Victoria		alcocks.com.au
ASICS	Japan	1949	Kihachiro Onitsuka	Kiyomi Wad, Chairman; Motoi Oyama President	Sportswear, sports equipment	Kobe, Japan	¥12.6 billion (2010)	www.asics.com
Brooks	United States	1914	Morris Goldenberg	Jim Weber, CEO	Sportswear, sports & accessories	Seattle, Washington, U.S.		www.brooksrunning.com
Burrda Sport	Qatar	2006			Teamwear, sportswear, shoes, sport accessories	Doha, Qatar		burrdasport.com
Castore	United Kingdom	6 July 2015	Philip & Thomas Beahon		Sportswear, clothing & accessories	Manchester, England, U.K.		castore.com
Champion	United States	1919			Clothing, sportswear, footwear	Winston-Salem, North Carolina, U.S.		www.champion.com
Charly	Mexico	1949			Athletic shoes, sportswear, apparel, goalkeeper gloves, footballs	Leon, Guanajuato, Mexico		www.charly.com/en/us%20charly.com/en/us
Columbia	United States	1938		Timothy Boyle (CEO and Acting Chairman); Thomas Cusick (CFO)	Clothing, sportswear, footwear	Beaverton, Oregon, U.S.		www.columbia.com
Converse (brand)	United States	1898	Marquis Mills Converse as Converse Rubber Shoe Company	Charles H. "Chuck" Taylor, Jack Purcell, Aaron Cain (President and CEO)	sneakers, clothing, Accessories	Boston, Massachusetts, U.S.	▲US$2.4 billion (2023)	converse.com
Cosco	India	1980		Devinder Kumar Jain (Managing Director & CEO); Narinder Kumar Jain (Managing Director)	Sportswear, sports equipment	Delhi, India	₹40.67 crore (March 2012)	www.cosco.in
Diadora	Italy	1948	Marcello Danieli	Marcello Danieli, Mario Moretti Polegato	Footwear, sportswear, accessories	Caerano di San Marco, Italy		www.diadora.com
Ellesse	Italy	1959	Leonardo Servadio		Clothing, sportswear, footwear	Chiugiana-La Commenda, Perugia, Italy		www.ellesse.com
Erreà	Italy	1988	Angelo Gandolfi		Athletic shoes, clothing, sports equipment	Torrile, Parma, Italy		www.errea.it
ERKE	China	2000	China Hongxing ERKE Group		Sportswear, sports equipment, footwear, accessories	Quanzhou, Fujian, China		erke-sportgoods.com
FBT	Thailand	1952	Kamol Chokephaibulkit	Kamol Chokephaibulkit, President; Phaveena Chokephaibulkit, Managing Director	Athletic shoes, clothing, sportswear, sports equipment	Bangkok, Thailand		www.fbtsports.com
Fila	South Korea	1911	Fila brothers in Biella, Italy	Founder; Giansevero Fila, Yoon-Soo Yoon, Chairman & CEO; Young-Chan Cho, President; Jon Epstein, President; Lee Dong Shik, Director	Athletic shoes, clothing & accessories, sportswear, sports equipment	Biella, Italy (1911–2007); Seoul, South Korea (since 2007)		www.fila.com
Gilbert Rugby	United Kingdom	1823	William Gilbert, Rugby, England	William Gilbert Gray Family, 2002–Present	Rugby Balls, rugby equipment, rugby boots, Netballs, sports equipment	East Sussex, England		www.gilbertrugby.com
Grand Sport	Thailand	1961	Kij Pluchcha-oom		Athletic shoes, clothing, sports equipment	Bangkok, Thailand		www.grandsport.com
Hummel	Denmark	1923	Messmer family in Hamburg, Germany		Sportswear, footwear	Aarhus, Denmark		www.hummel.net
Interloop Limited	Pakistan	1992	Musadaq Zulqarnain	Navid Fazil Tariq Rashid	Yarn, Hosiery, denim and apparel.	Faisalabad, Pakistan	RS 43 billion (US$150 Million 2023.	http://interloop-pk.com/
Jako	Germany	1 November 1989	Rudi Sprügel and his brother	Rudi Sprügel, Chairman	Sportswear, sports equipment	Mulfingen, Baden-Württemberg, Germany	€63.8 million (2008)	www.jako.de
Joma	Spain	1965			Footwear, clothing, accessories	Portillo de Toledo, Spain		www.joma-sport.com
Kappa	Italy	1967		Marco Boglione, President; Gianni Crespi, CEO	Clothing, sportswear, footwear	Turin, Italy	€111 million (2013)	www.kappa.com
Kelme	Spain	1963	Diego Quiles and José Quiles	Carlos García Cobaleda (President)	Sportswear, footwear	Elche, Spain		www.kelme.com
Lacoste	France	1933	René Lacoste		Athletic shoes, clothing & accessories, sportswear, sports equipment	Troyes, France		www.lacoste.com/us/
Le Coq Sportif	France	1882	Émile Camuset		Sportswear, sports equipment, accessories	Entzheim, France		www.lecoqsportif.com/fr-fr/
Legea	Italy	1990	Salvatore Miraglia	Luigi, Emilia, Franco Acanfora	Sportswear, Sports equipment, accessories	Pompei, Italy		www.legea.com
Lonsdale	United Kingdom	1960	by Bernard Hart, owner by Frasers Group		Sports equipment, clothing, footwear	England		
Lotto	Italy	1973	Caberlotto family		Sportswear, sports equipment, accessories	Treviso, Italy		www.lottosport.com
Macron	Italy	1971		Francesco Bormioli, President; Gianluca Pavanello, CEO	Sportswear, sports equipment, accessories	Crespellano, Bologna, Italy		www.macron.com
Marathon	Ecuador	1981	Rodrigo Rivadeneira		Athletic shoes, clothing, sports equipment	Quito, Ecuador		www.marathon-sports.com
Mitre	United Kingdom	1817	Benjamin Crook		Football balls and uniforms, rugby balls, sportswear, apparel, accessories	Wakefield, England, U.K.		mitre.com
Mizuno	Japan	1906	Rihachi & Rizo Mizuno	Masato Mizuno (Chairman)	Clothing, sportswear, footwear, sports equipment	Suminoe, Osaka, Japan		www.mizunousa.com
New Balance	United States	1906	William J. Riley	Jim Davis, Chairman; Robert T. DeMartini, CEO	Athletic shoes, sportswear, sports equipment	Boston, Massachusetts, U.S.	US$2.29 billion (2012)	www.newbalance.com
Nike	United States	1971	Bill Bowerman; Phil Knight	Phil Knight, Chairman Emeritus; Mark Parker, chairman, President, & CEO; Andrew Campion, CFO	Sportswear, sports equipment	Washington County, Oregon, U.S.	US$15.465 billion (2012)	www.nike.com
Nivia	India	1934	Nihal Chand Kharbanda	Vijay Kharabanda, CMD (1940 - 2017); Rajesh Kharabanda, Managing Director	Sportswear, sports equipment, accessories, athletic shoes, soccer balls, basketballs	Jalandhar, Punjab, India		www.niviasports.com
Olympikus	Brazil	1975	Vulcabras-Azaleia	Athletic shoes, footwear, clothing, accessories, sports equipment	Jundiaí, São Paulo, Brazil		www.olympikus.com.br	
Patrick	Belgium	1892	Patrice Beneteau in Vendée, France		Sportswear, athletic shoes	Oudenaarde, East Flanders, Belgium		www.patrick.eu
Peak	China	1989			Footwear, accessories, sportswear	Quanzhou, Fujian, China		peaksport.com
Penalty	Brazil	1970	Malharia Cambuci S.A.	Eduardo Estefano, CEO	Athletic shoes, apparel, sports equipment, accessories, balls	São Paulo, Brazil	US$133.7 million (2012)	www.penalty.com.br
PF Flyers	United States	1937	B.F. Goodrich	Jack Purcell	Apparel, Clothing, Shoes	Boston (Allston, neighborhood), Massachusetts, U.S.	$5.7m annual revenue (2024)	www.pfflyers.com
Pirma	Mexico	1990	Rafael León		Athletic shoes, sportswear, apparel, goalkeeper gloves, footballs	Purisima del Rincón, Guanajuato, Mexico		pirma.com.mx
Rajco Industry USA	United States	1935	M. Shaffi Bhatti	Ijaz-Bhatti (CEO) M. Shahbaz Bhatti (Executive Director)	Sportswear, apparel, uniforms, Workwear,	Sialkot, Pakistan	$107m annual revenue (2024)	Rajcousa.com
Provogue	India	1997		Arun Bhargava (Chairman & Ind.Director), Nikhil Chaturvedi (Managing Director	Sportswear, Apparel	Mumbai, India		www.provogue.com
Puma	Germany	1948	Rudolf Dassler	Bjørn Gulden, CEO; Michael Lämmermann, CFO; Lars Sørensen, COO	Sportswear, sports equipment, accessories	Herzogenaurach, Germany	€2.367 billion (2010)	puma.com
Quick	Netherlands	1905	Herman Jansen		Sportswear, sports equipment	Hengelo, Gelderland, Netherlands		www.q1905.com
Reebok	United States	1895	J.W. Foster in Bolton, England, U.K.		Sportswear, sports equipment	Bolton, England, U.K. (1958–1984); Canton, Massachusetts, U.S. (1984–2016); Boston, Massachusetts, U.S. (since 2016)		reebok.com
Reusch	Germany	1934	Karl Reusch	Erich Weitzmann	Sportswear, sports equipment, goalkeeper gloves	Reutlingen, Germany		www.reusch.com
Romai	(United Arab Emirates) U.A.E.	18 July 2012	Khamis Al-Rumaithy		Sportswear, sports equipment, accessories	United Arab Emirates		www.romaiworld.com
Saeta	Colombia	1982			Footwear, sportswear	Bogotá, Colombia		www.saetasport.com
Saucony	United States	1898	William A. Donmoyer, Thomas S. Levan, Walter C.C. Snyder, and Benjamin F. Reider	Abraham R Hyde	Athletic shoes, jackets, hoodies, T-shirts, sweatpants, shorts, socks, hats, backpacks	Boston (Waltham, suburb), Massachusetts, U.S.	$93.4m annual revenue (2024)	saucony.com
Select	Denmark	1947	Eigil Nielsen	Peter Knap (CEO); Preben Kønig (Chairman)	Football, sportswear Protective gear	Copenhagen, Denmark		www.select-sport.com/en
Seven	India	2007	MS Dhoni		Footwear, sportswear	Delhi, India		https://7.life/
SG	India	1931	Kedar Nath Anand & Dwarka Nath Anand		Cricket clothing and equipment, Footwear	Meerut, Uttar Pradesh, India		https://shop.teamsg.in/
Tryout sports	Pakistan	2008	Wahab		Sportswear, sports equipment, accessories	Sialkot, Pakistan		tryout-sports.com
Topper	Brazil	1975	Alpargatas Argentina	Carlos Wizard Martins	Uniforms and apparel balls (association football, basketball, futsal, rugby union, tennis) footwear, accessories	São Paulo, Brazil		www.topper.com.brwww.topper.com.ar
TYKA	India	2009	Rajan Kohli	Rajan Kohli, MD; Sonal Kohli	Sportswear, sports equipment, accessories	Jalandhar, Punjab, India		www.tyka.com
Uhlsport	Germany	1948		Dominik Solleder, Melanie Steinhilber, MD	Footwear, sports equipment, clothing & accessories	Balingen, Baden-Württemberg, Germany	€58.7 million (2012)	www.uhlsportcompany.com
Umbro	United Kingdom	23 May 1924	Harold & Wallace Humphreys		Sportswear, sports equipment	Manchester, England, U.K.		www.umbro.com
Under Armour	United States	25 September 1996	Kevin Plank		Sportswear, sports equipment	Baltimore, Maryland, U.S.		www.underarmour.com
Wilson	United States	1913	Thomas E. Wilson		Balls, rackets, uniforms, apparel	Chicago, Illinois, U.S.	US$930 million (2010)	wilson.com
Xtep	China	2001	Ding Shui Po		Sportswear, sports equipment, apparel & accessories	Hong Kong, China		xtep.com
