= List of oldest companies in Australia =

This list of oldest businesses and companies in Australia includes businesses, whether incorporated or organised in a different form (such as a partnership). However, the list excludes non-commercial associations and educational, governmental, or religious organisations. The list only includes businesses that still operate today under either the same name or a variant (such as a contraction or a part) of the original name, since inception.

| Year | Business or Company | Field | Sources |
|---|---|---|---|
| 1808 | Summerville Farm | Farm | |
| 1809 | Australia Post | Postal Service provider | |
| 1815 | The Bush Inn, Tasmania | Australian pub | |
| 1815 | Hope and Anchor Tavern | Australian pub | |
| 1815 | Macquarie Arms Hotel | Australian pub | |
| 1817 | Westpac | Banking | |
| 1822 | Allens | Law | |
| 1822 | Ratho Farm Golf Links | Farm | |
| 1824 | Australian Agricultural Company | Farm | |
| 1824 | Cascade Brewery | Brewing | |
| 1825 | Van Diemen's Land Company | Farm | |
| 1827 | MinterEllison | Law | |
| 1828 | Fortune of War Hotel | Australian pub | |
| 1829 | Lionel Samson and Son | Merchant | |
| 1831 | Webster Limited | | |
| 1832 | Mallesons | Law | |
| 1833 | Clayton Utz | Law | |
| 1833 | Theatre Royal, Sydney | | |
| 1835 | ANZ Bank | Banking | |
| 1835 | Mountcastle & Sons | Hat manufacturer | |
| 1836 | Houghton Wines | Winemaking | |
| 1837 | Fowler Potteries | | |
| 1837 | Swan Brewery | Brewing | |
| 1838 | David Jones | Retail | |
| 1839 | Elders | | |
| 1840 | Sandalford Wines | Winemaking | |
| 1841 | Ashurst Australia | Law | |
| 1841 | Lord Nelson Hotel, Millers Point | Australian pub | |
| 1843 | Hero of Waterloo Hotel | Australian pub | |
| 1843 | Lindeman's | Winemaking | |
| 1844 | Birchalls | Book shop | |
| 1844 | Penfolds | Winemaking | |
| 1846 | The Courier-Mail | Newspaper | |
| 1846 | Insignia Financial | | |
| 1847 | Orlando Wines | Winemaking | |
| 1848 | BankSA | Banking | |
| 1849 | AMP | Finance | |
| 1849 | Harris Scarfe | Retail | |
| 1850 | Baxter Boots | Footwear | |
| 1851 | John Sands | | |
| 1852 | Bosisto's | Eucalyptus oil | |
| 1852 | Grand View Hotel | Australian pub | |
| 1852 | McKenzie's | Food | |
| 1853 | Alcocks | Billiard Table Manufacturers | |
| 1853 | Bates Smart | | |
| 1853 | Balfours | Bakery | |
| 1853 | Crown & Anchor, Adelaide | | |
| 1853 | Dimmeys | | |
| 1854 | Anchor Foods | | |
| 1854 | Maldon Bakery | Bakery | |
| 1855 | CSR | Sugar refining | |
| 1855 | Wilmar Sugar Australia | Sugar refining | |
| 1857 | Old Canberra Inn | Australian pub | |
| 1858 | Backwell IXL | Manufacturing | |
| 1858 | P. Blashki & Sons | Manufacturing | |
| 1858 | Bendigo & Adelaide Bank | Building society | |
| 1858 | Bendigo Pottery | | |
| 1858 | Fairfax & Roberts | Jewellery | |
| 1862 | Coopers Brewery | Brewing | |
| 1863 | ALS | Chemical manufacturing (as Campbell Brothers) | |
| 1863 | Bank of Queensland | Banking | |
| 1864 | Gundagai Bakery | Bakery | |
| 1864 | Nindigully Pub | Australian pub | |
| 1864 | Saxbys Soft Drinks | Beverage manufacturing | |
| 1864 | J. Furphy & Sons | Manufacturing | |
| 1865 | Arnott's Biscuits | Foodstuff manufacturing | |
| 1865 | Billson's Brewery | Brewing | |
| 1865 | Godfrey Hirst | Carpet manufacturing | |
| 1865 | Kirks | Manufacturing | |
| 1866 | Best's Great Western | Winemaking | |
| 1865 | McMaster’s Pies | Pie shop | |
| 1867 | William Inglis & Son | | |
| 1870 | Blundstone Footwear | Footwear | |
| 1870 | Ritchies Stores | | |
| 1872 | Donohue’s Quality Meats | Butcher shop | |
| 1873 | Rio Tinto | Mining | |
| 1873 | The Riverine Grazier | Newspaper | |
| 1874 | Bickford's Australia | Beverage manufacturing | |
| 1875 | Power & Cartwright | Law | |
| 1875 | Gunns | Timber | |
| 1875 | Brambles | Logistics | |
| 1875 | Heritage Bank | Banking | |
| 1876 | Pivot Stove & Heating | Heating Retailer | |
| 1876 | QBD Books | Book shop | |
| 1876 | Victor Churchill | Butcher shop | |
| 1877 | Dahlsens Building Centres | Building | |
| 1877 | North Australian Pastoral Company | Pastoral | |
| 1877 | Evan Evans | Printing, canvas & flag manufacturing | |
| 1877 | Schweppes Australia | Beverage manufacturing | |
| 1879 | Dymocks | Book shop | |
| 1879 | Griffiths Brothers Teas | Tea and coffee | |
| 1879 | J. L .Lennard Pty. Ltd. | Food, Packaging and Pharmaceutical Machinery Sales and Service | |
| 1880 | IMB Bank | Banking | |
| 1882 | Adbri | Building products | |
| 1882 | Nerada Tea | Tea and coffee | |
| 1883 | Birdsall Leather | | |
| 1883 | Boag's Brewery | Brewing | |
| 1883 | Bushells | Tea and coffee | |
| 1883 | Harris Coffee | Tea and coffee | |
| 1883 | Raine & Horne | Real estate | |
| 1883 | Earp Bros | Tiles and hardware | |
| 1884 | Alexanders Cigar Merchants | Tobacco products | |
| 1884 | Beenleigh Rum | Rum distilling | |
| 1884 | J. H. Cutler | Bespoke Tailor & Shirt Maker | |
| 1884 | Stuart Alexander & Company | | |
| 1885 | BHP | Mining | |
| 1885 | Doyles on the Beach | Fish and chip shop | |
| 1886 | Angus & Robertson | Book shop | |
| 1886 | Cascade Beverages | Beverage manufacturing | |
| 1886 | Angove Family Winemakers | Winemaking | |
| 1886 | Bunnings | Timber, hardware | |
| 1886 | QBE Insurance | Insurance | |
| 1887 | Oliver Boots | Footwear | |
| 1887 | Tumbulgum Tavern | Australian pub | |
| 1887 | Willow Ware Australia | Tinware manufacturing | |
| 1888 | Bundaberg Rum | Rum distilling | |
| 1888 | Willie Smith's | Cider | |
| 1888 | James Hardie | Building products | |
| 1888 | Jumbuck Pastoral Company | | |
| 1888 | Noyes Brothers | | |
| 1888 | Toll | Haulage | |
| 1888 | Warrnambool Cheese and Butter | Dairy | |
| 1889 | Blakistons | | |
| 1889 | Brown Brothers Milawa Vineyard | Winemaking | |
| 1889 | Wormald International | | |
| 1890 | Henry Bucks | Clothing retail | |
| 1890 | Kookaburra Sport | | |
| 1891 | Allen's | Confectionery manufacturing | |
| 1891 | IXL | Jam and conserve manufacturing | |
| 1892 | BCR Australia | International Freight Forwarding | |
| 1892 | Betts Group | Shoes | |
| 1892 | Sabco | Broom and brush manufacturer | |
| 1893 | Berts Soft Drinks | Beverage manufacturing | |
| 1893 | Uncle Tobys | Food manufacturing | |
| 1894 | EV2 Sportswear | Sportswear | |
| 1894 | Val Morgan | Advertising | |
| 1895 | Angus & Coote | | |
| 1895 | Australian Paper | | |
| 1895 | Bankwest | Banking | |
| 1897 | Akubra | Hat manufacturer | |
| 1897 | Hamodava | | |
| 1897 | Northcote Pottery | | |
| 1898 | Cyclone Fence & Gate Company | | |
| 1898 | Lowes Menswear | Clothing retail | |
| 1898 | Alderdice Brassfounders | Pump and valve manufacturing | |
| 1898 | Driza-Bone | Outerwear | |
| 1899 | A.H. Beard | Bedding | |
| 1899 | Bega Cheese | Dairy | |
| 1899 | Cairns Bank | Banking | |
| 1899 | River Port Beverages | Beverage manufacturing | |
| 1899 | S Kidman & Company | Pastoral | |
| 1899 | UGL Rail | | |
| 1900 | Myer | Retail | |
| 1901 | Ferguson Plarre's Bakehouse | Bakery | |
| 1903 | Soul Patts | Retail Pharmacy chain; Investment company | |
| 1906 | Winning Appliances | Retailer | |
| 1910 | Lucas' Papaw Ointment | | |
| 1910 | Rossi Boots | Footwear | |
| 1910 | Stowe Australia | | |
| 1911 | Commonwealth Bank | Banking | |
| 1912 | Hutchinson Builders | Construction | |
| 1914 | Stadiums Limited | Events, Live Music, Promoting and Boxing | |
| 1914 | Wesfarmers | Retail | |
| 1916 | Nilsen Group | | |
| 1917 | Wallace Bishop | Retail | |
| 1917 | Sims Metal | Metal recycling | |
| 1917 | Dawn Tools | Manufacturing | |
| 1919 | Three Threes | Manufacturing | |
| 1920 | Qantas | Airline | |
| 1925 | Filmer Sceats | Eyewear manufacturing | |

== See also ==
- List of oldest companies
- Companies by year of establishment
