= Rosella (brand) =

Australian food company

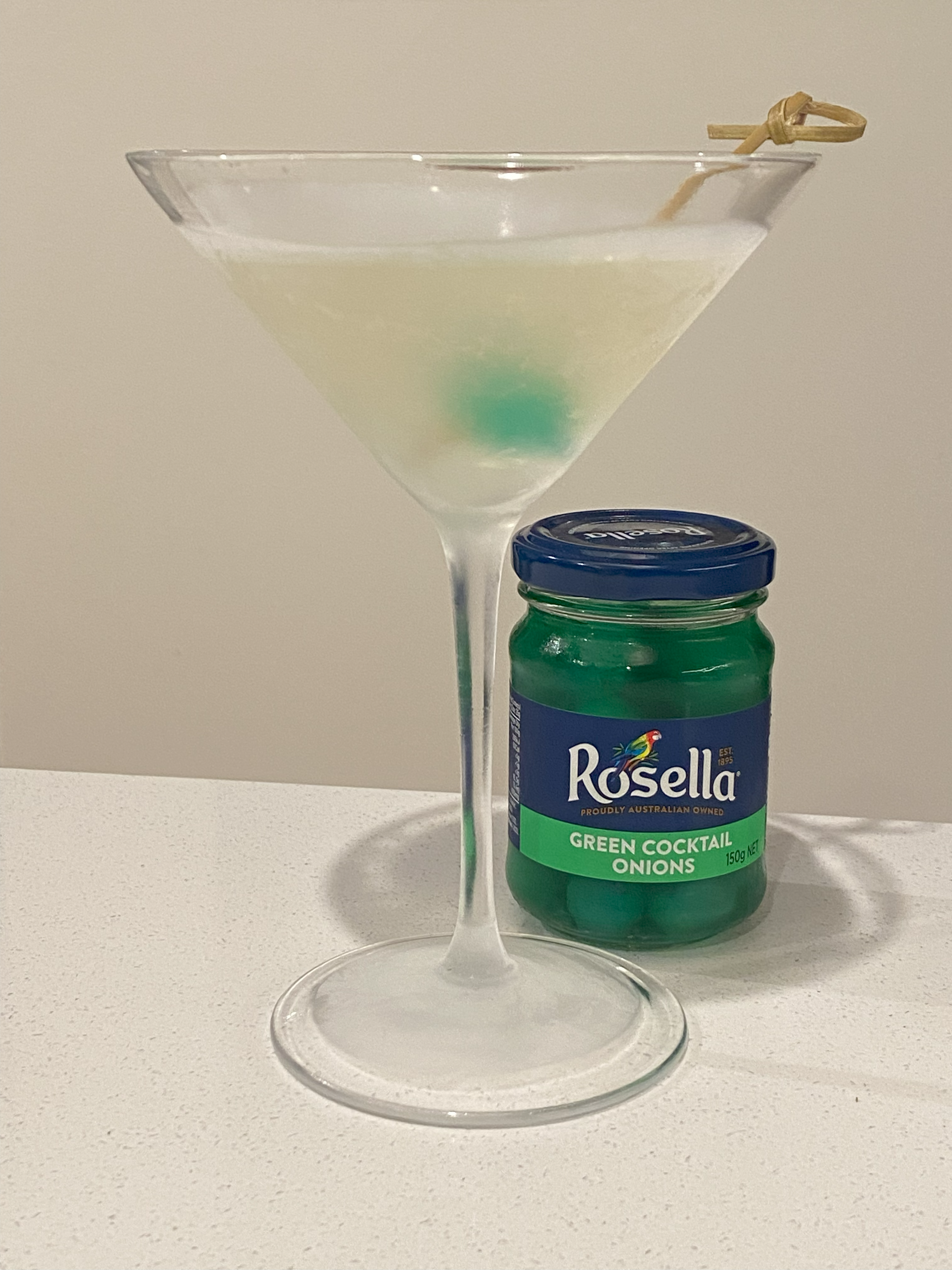
- Type: Subsidiary
- Founded: 1895; 131 years ago
- Headquarters: Victoria, Australia
- Area served: Worldwide
- Products: Soups, Sauces, Condiments
- Parent: Sabrands Australia
- Website: rosella.com.au

Rosella is a brand of tomato soup, tomato sauces, pickled vegetables, and condiments, founded in Australia in 1895 as the Rosella Preserving & Manufacturing Co. Rosella has had a number of owners since, including a 40-year period where it was owned by Unilever. The current owner is Sabrands Australia, which acquired the brand in April 2013.

It is named after the Australian parrot of the same name, which forms part of its logo.

== History ==
The Rosella brand began in 1895 when founders H.R. McCracken (a commission agent) and T.J. Press (a grocer) started making jams and preserving fruits in a backyard in Carlton, Victoria. With the financial backing of Frederick John Cato (of grocery chain Moran & Cato) the company opened a small factory in Flinders Street, Melbourne before the Rosella Preserving Company opened its Richmond, Victoria, factory in 1905.

Rosella soon gained a reputation for their tomato sauce, which was first produced in 1899 and which has since become one of Australia's best known food brands, although the company also produces soup and tomato chutney. The company grew from its initial staff of six and by 1931 had over 1000 employees spread across six factories.

== Ownership history ==
In 1963 Rosella was taken over by Lever & Kitchen, later to be known as Unilever and it remained under their ownership for most of the next four decades. In 2002 the company returned to Australian ownership under Stuart Alexander & Company, who purchased the brand under a deal with Unilever. Under the agreement, Unilever would retain ownership of the Rosella factory for five years, and during that period would continue to produce the Rosella products under contract to Stuart Alexander. Stuart Alexander retained ownership of Rosella until 2006, when the Rosella brand was sold once more.

In December 2012, the then current owner of Rosella, Gourmet Food Holdings (who also owned Waterwheel & Pitango), was placed into receivership. After unsuccessful attempts to sell the company it was announced in early March 2013 that the company would be closed down and that the receivers were looking at selling the Rosella brand to a new owner.

In April 2013, Sabrands Australia, a private family company and the company behind Sunraysia fruit juice, purchased the Rosella brand and is manufacturing its soups, chutneys and relishes in Adelaide, South Australia and its condiments in Silvan, Victoria.

== See also ==
- List of brand name condiments
- List of oldest companies in Australia
