= Motoi =

Motoi is a Japanese name which may refer to:

- Motoi -motoi, the 8th song on the music album Amachan by Matsuko Mawatari.

== People ==
=== Given name ===
- Motoi Oyama (尾山 基, born 1951), Japanese businessman
- Motoi Sakuraba (桜庭 統, born 1965), Japanese musician and composer

=== Surname ===
- Emi Motoi (本井 えみ, born 1971), Japanese voice actress
- George Motoi (1936–2015), Romanian actor at the Cluj-Napoca National Theatre

== Fictional characters ==
- Yazaki Motoi, politician in Ghost Hound
