= Beenleigh Rum Distillery =

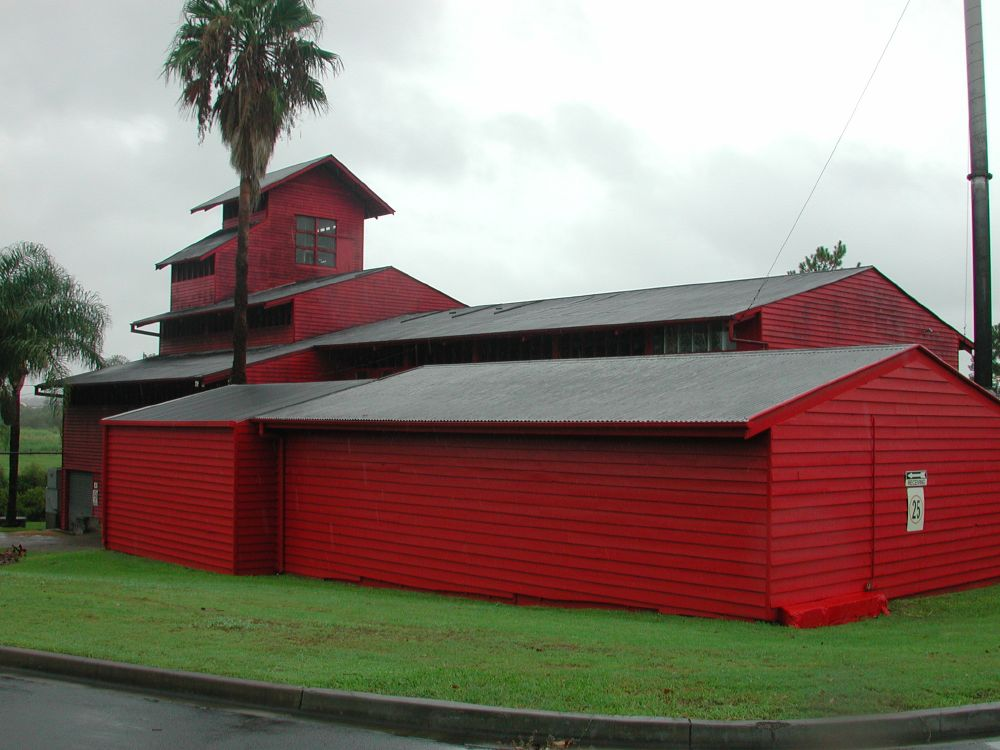
- Beenleigh Rum Distillery

- Location within Queensland
- 27.7238°S 153.2224°E
- Location: Distillery Road, Eagleby, City of Logan, Queensland, Australia

History
- Design period: 1870s - 1890s (late 19th century)
- Built: c. 1890 - c. 1980

Queensland Heritage Register
- Official name: Beenleigh Rum Distillery
- Type: state heritage (built)
- Designated: 6 March 2004
- Reference no.: 602470
- Significant period: c. 1890 (fabric); 1884-1969, 1972-c. 2003 (historical)
- Significant components: factory building, still house, store/s / storeroom / storehouse

Beenleigh Rum Distillery is a heritage-listed rum distillery at Distillery Road, Eagleby (once part of Beenleigh), City of Logan, Queensland, Australia. The distillery produces Beenleigh Rum. It was built from c. 1890 to c. 1980. It was added to the Queensland Heritage Register on 6 March 2004.

== History ==
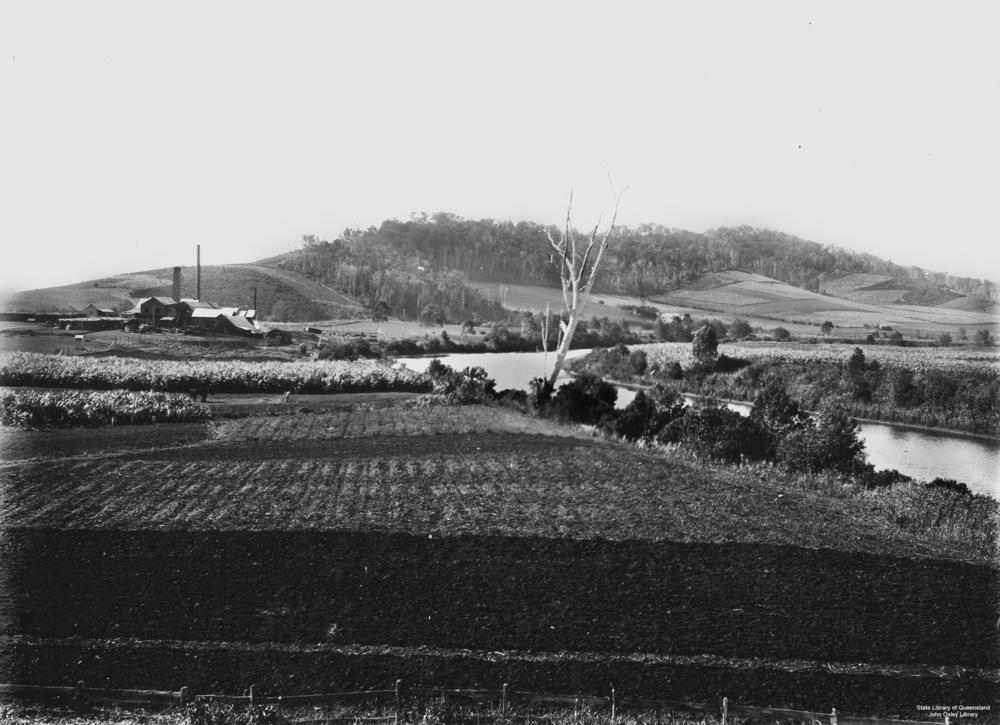
Beenleigh Rum Distillery, circa 1912

The Beenleigh Rum Distillery on the banks of the Albert River was licensed in 1884 and utilised molasses from sugar grown and crushed in the area. The town of Beenleigh developed consequent to the growth of sugar related industries in the area and took its name from the plantation that the preceded the establishment of the distillery.

Moreton Bay penal colony commandant Captain Patrick Logan explored the area around the Logan and Albert Rivers in 1826. Timbergetters in search of cedar and hardwoods moved into the district around 1840, but the first European settlers took up land in 1864 under the Sugar and Coffee regulations, a government scheme to encourage the growing of these potentially valuable crops in the new colony of Queensland. Leases of between 320 and 1,280 acres (130 and 520 ha) were available for three years with an option to purchase, in order to encourage the establishment of plantations. 39 leases were granted in the first months of the scheme's operation of which 10 were in the Logan area, and at all of which it was intended to grow sugar.

Sugar cane had been first brought to Australia in 1788 but subsequent plantings at Sydney, Port Macquarie and Norfolk Island failed to be commercially viable. Captain Louis Hope grew a cane crop successfully in Ormiston in Queensland in 1862. By 1864 the first commercial sugar mill in Australia had been established by him at Ormiston and interest in growing sugar cane spread rapidly. By 1867 an estimated 2,000 acres (810 ha) were under cane in the Brisbane area and by the end of the decade, cane had also been successfully established further north at Maryborough, Mackay and Bundaberg, where the warmer climate proved more suitable, and sugar was established as a major commercial crop in Queensland.

An area of land between the Albert and Logan Rivers was planted with cane in 1865 by the partnership of Francis Gooding and John Davy. The brothers-in-law had arrived in Brisbane from Devon, England, in 1862 and named their new plantation "Beenleigh" after their home in England. By 1866 their plantation was productive and in 1868, the Inspector of Distilleries reported that the Logan area had 802 acres (325 ha) under cultivation and a still was in the course of erection at "Malungmovel", George Board's plantation. The production of rum was encouraged by the Queensland Government as it brought in revenue from taxes and was a popular commodity, being easier to keep and transport than beer or wines in an era when transport was slow.

A mobile distillery also served the numerous plantations along the rivers. This was the steam operated "Walrus", a boat which was built at Cleveland in 1864 as a sailing vessel, then sold in 1869 to James Stewart who converted it to steam and installed a still. A licence to operate as a floating distillery was reluctantly granted on 14 April 1869 by the Inspector of Distilleries, although he deemed the boat unsuitable for the purpose, as there was then no other licensed distillery in the area. The boat then operated as the Pioneer Floating Sugar Mill. Its licence was not renewed in 1872 as it did not fulfil the requirement to carry cane-crushing equipment and acted solely as a distillery, producing rum from molasses. This is the thick syrup remaining after cane juice has been crystallised by boiling to produce sugar. Rum is produced from this by-product by adding water and yeast and fermenting the mixture. This is then boiled and the alcohol vapour separated out by distillation, the condensate being collected, perhaps charcoal filtered, and stored in casks to mature.

By 1869 Davy and Gooding had 55 acres (22 ha) under cane and were constructing a sugar mill, which was in operation by the following year. The boom in sugar in the region in the 1870s led to the rapid development of the nearby township that took its name from the Beenleigh plantation. By 1876 this was described by Baillière's Gazetteer as a provincial centre serving an area with nine sugar mills and two distilleries within six kilometres of the township.

After the 'Walrus's' licence was withdrawn it is said to have carried on its operations illegally for some years. In 1883 the boat was beached on the banks of the Albert River and Francis Gooding purchased its still, obtaining a distillery licence in June 1884. The price of sugar fell in 1884 and this may have had some bearing on the decision to include distilling in the partnership's operations The Beenleigh distillery had 9,877 imperial gallons (44,900 L; 11,862 US gal) of rum on hand by 31 March 1885. The Post Office Directory for that year lists three distilleries in the area: Ageston, Davy and Gooding, and the Loganholme Sugar Company. Many small plantations in the area failed in the 1880s due also to frosts, disease and soil exhaustion. The river flats in the Logan River area where many plantations had been located for ease of transport were also prone to flooding.

In 1887 a flood washed the whole Davy and Gooding distillery, including a large stock of rum, down the river. However, it was soon re-established after the purchase of a still, said to be from Coulderey's Ageston distillery at Rocky Point. The Logansholme plant closed at this time, though Ageston kept going until the early 1890s. In 1890 a brick spirit store was constructed at Beenleigh and the building appears to have been built in two stages, though the construction is similar. The Beenleigh Sugar Mill continued in operation as well as the distillery. In 1895, the business appears in the Queensland Post Office Directory as the Albert River Milling and Distillery Co with Albert Kleinschmidt as the manager.

In the 1890s milling had become a more specialised process due to technical advances and many of the smaller plantations closed following the recession of this era. The Beenleigh distillery appears to have prospered, however, and in 1899 Beenleigh rum won a gold medal at the London International Fair. By then the brand was well known and sold as far away as Cairns.

1904, The Albert River Milling and Distillery Co Limited purchased the land on which the distillery was located and in 1908, the Beenleigh Distillery was listed separately to the mill. In 1912, a new title was issued for the land in the name of Albert Kleinschmidt and in 1917 Thomas Brown and Sons Ltd purchased the business, which operated as the Beenleigh Rum Distillery Pty Ltd. Browns made many changes including the installation of eight large kauri pine vats, remodelling and enlarging the stills and upgrading other machinery. They also used railway transport to bring in molasses from the Isis district, Bingera, Gin Gin and Woongalba. In 1936 the distillery was described as having its own landing and unloading wharf, a complete power plant, cooper's shop and all necessary facilities to make it a self-contained producer of rum. A flood in 1947 washed away the pump house and a lavatory building.

In 1969 the distillery ceased production due to falling demand. However, in 1972 Mervyn Davy and his two sons purchased the distillery and production resumed. The bottling plant was modernised and also bottled whisky, brandy, gin, vodka and ouzo. A new warehouse, office block and showroom were built. The distillery was flooded in 1974 when all records were lost. Applications were lodged with the Council for a new vat store, bottle store and two "houses", only one of which appears to have been constructed. At that time there were two brick warehouses along the road, which are thought to have been constructed in the late 1950s or 1960s. In 1975 the buildings on site comprised the still house, tanks, a brick store and bottling room, an office, two bulk stores and a cellar. A bulk store was proposed.

In 1980 the Moran family acquired the complex. She purchased additional land adjacent to the distillery, which underwent major redevelopment and renovation works. A dam was constructed beside the distillery on the site of an earlier dam, which had existed since at least 1908. The floor of the spirit store was excavated and two higher sections were inserted into the roof of the still house, which was painted the bright red it is now. The fermentation vats were removed, but old timber vats were retained, as was the relocated copper still.

Rum may be light or darkened by the presence of caramels. The darker rums are usually distilled in "pot stills", which are considered to be less efficient than column distillation, retaining more flavour elements, though this may be desirable in the case of spirits such as rum or whisky, where such elements provide a distinctive character. Rums may also be produced by blending pot and column distilled rums. The pot still at Beenleigh has been in use since 1887, though at least parts of it may be much earlier.

Modern continuous distillation columns were added to the still house and new fermentation vats were installed with metal walkways constructed to access their upper levels. The work was completed in 1981. A small museum was created, the exhibits mainly comprising photographs and scale models. At least one timber building was demolished in this development, as were the decorative 19th century gateposts at the main entrance.

In 1984 Tarac Industries acquired a controlling interest in the complex, which was modified and extended in a "massive redevelopment". The license of the Twin River Tavern at Eagleby was transferred to the new tavern. The complex had private and public bars, bistros, a restaurant, TAB, drive-in bottle shop, liquor barn, craft shop and other facilities. By 1987 it was referred to as the Beenleigh Distillery and Moran's Wharf complex and had a tourist park license. Newspapers refer to plans to "update the technology and methods". In 1988 the tavern complex was sold, the distillery being retained by Tarac.

A number of distillery buildings were constructed in the 1990s including a large machinery canopy (1992), a warehouse and bottling hall and offices (1994). At this time a warehouse was demolished and in 1996 a new warehouse was added.

In 2003 the brand name and existing supplies of bulk spirits were sold to Vok Beverages. A new Visitors Centre was built on site from an existing building.

Remnants of Cyclone Debbie flooded the Beenleigh area in March 2017. As a result of these rising waters, the Beenleigh Distillery was affected. Water breached the main distillery building affecting the electrical cabling inside and stopping production for 6 months.

== Description ==
The Beenleigh Rum distillery is located on an area of level ground on the bank of the Albert River at Eagleby. It is surrounded by open land and an area between the distillery and the river has been landscaped and has plantings of palm trees. The modern buildings are grouped towards the entrance and are linked by a bitumen-paved area. There is a large dam located next to the still house and spirit store.

Most of the buildings on site have been built in the last two decades and are constructed of brick and modern metal sheeting. These comprise offices, storerooms, and a bottling plant. There are also modern storage tanks and walkways. There is a small museum in one of the brick stores.

The main distillery building, comprising a brick and timber still house and attached brick spirit stores is the oldest building on site. The spirit store is composed of two joined English bond brick buildings on concrete footings and with modern concrete floors. They have separate hipped roofs clad with corrugated metal sheeting and the interior of the roof of the smaller building has battens suitable for shingles. Both sections have high square windows fitted with iron bars and timber lintels. Large timber vats on masonry stands are still in place in both sections of the store.

The still house is built of timber with sections of wall in English bond brick and has a concrete floor. The building is clad in weatherboard over vertical studs and has timber trusses and posts. Ventilation panels have been created below the roof and at waist height by omitting sections of cladding. At the end of the building nearest the river two new higher sections have been inserted creating a tower like effect. This new section has steel trusses and has large square windows towards the river.

The distillery is equipped with modern distilling equipment including fermenting vats and column stills; however, the copper pot still remains. The upper levels of the still house are accessed by modern steel stairs and decking. To the rear of the distillery, a canopy has been erected over a steam boiler of unknown date.

Beside the distillery is a small rectangular building clad in weatherboard, which has a gabled low-pitched roof clad in corrugated metal sheeting. It is used as a workshop and for some general storage. It also has a two bay garage with roller doors attached.

== Heritage listing ==
Beenleigh Rum Distillery was listed on the Queensland Heritage Register on 6 March 2004 having satisfied the following criteria.

The place is important in demonstrating the evolution or pattern of Queensland's history.

The sugar industry has been of great importance to the development of Queensland for its contribution to the economy and to the pattern of European settlement. The Logan area was the site of some of the earliest sugar plantations, mills and distilleries in Queensland. The industry in the area was distinguished from that developing further north by being on a small scale, based on farms and private mills, rather than on large central mills. The Beenleigh Rum Distillery was, until very recently, the oldest working distillery in Queensland. The main distillery buildings are evidence for a major early industrial enterprise in the Logan area, which is linked with an important phase in the development of the sugar industry in Queensland. The Beenleigh plantation, mill and distillery business was a key factor in the development of the town of Beenleigh and the surrounding area.

The place demonstrates rare, uncommon or endangered aspects of Queensland's cultural heritage.

The Beenleigh rum distillery is a rare survivor of the early sugar industry in south east Queensland and preserves a 19th-century copper pot still which was part of the original equipment of the distillery. It is thought to be the earliest still of this type in Queensland.

The place is important because of its aesthetic significance.

The distillery complex, particularly the main still house building, is a landmark which stands out from the river flats on which it is built and can readily be seen from the Pacific Highway and from the Albert River.

The place has a strong or special association with a particular community or cultural group for social, cultural or spiritual reasons.

The Beenleigh distillery is a focus of memory for many people who have worked there or whose forebears have worked there and it is closely associated with the identity of the area by the local community.
