= Beenleigh Rum =

Coordinates: 27.72331°S 153.22196°E

- Type: Rum
- Manufacturer: Vok Beverages
- Distributor: Vok Beverages
- Origin: Australia, worldwide
- Introduced: 1884; 142 years ago
- Colour: Dark and White
- Website: https://www.beenleighrum.com.au/

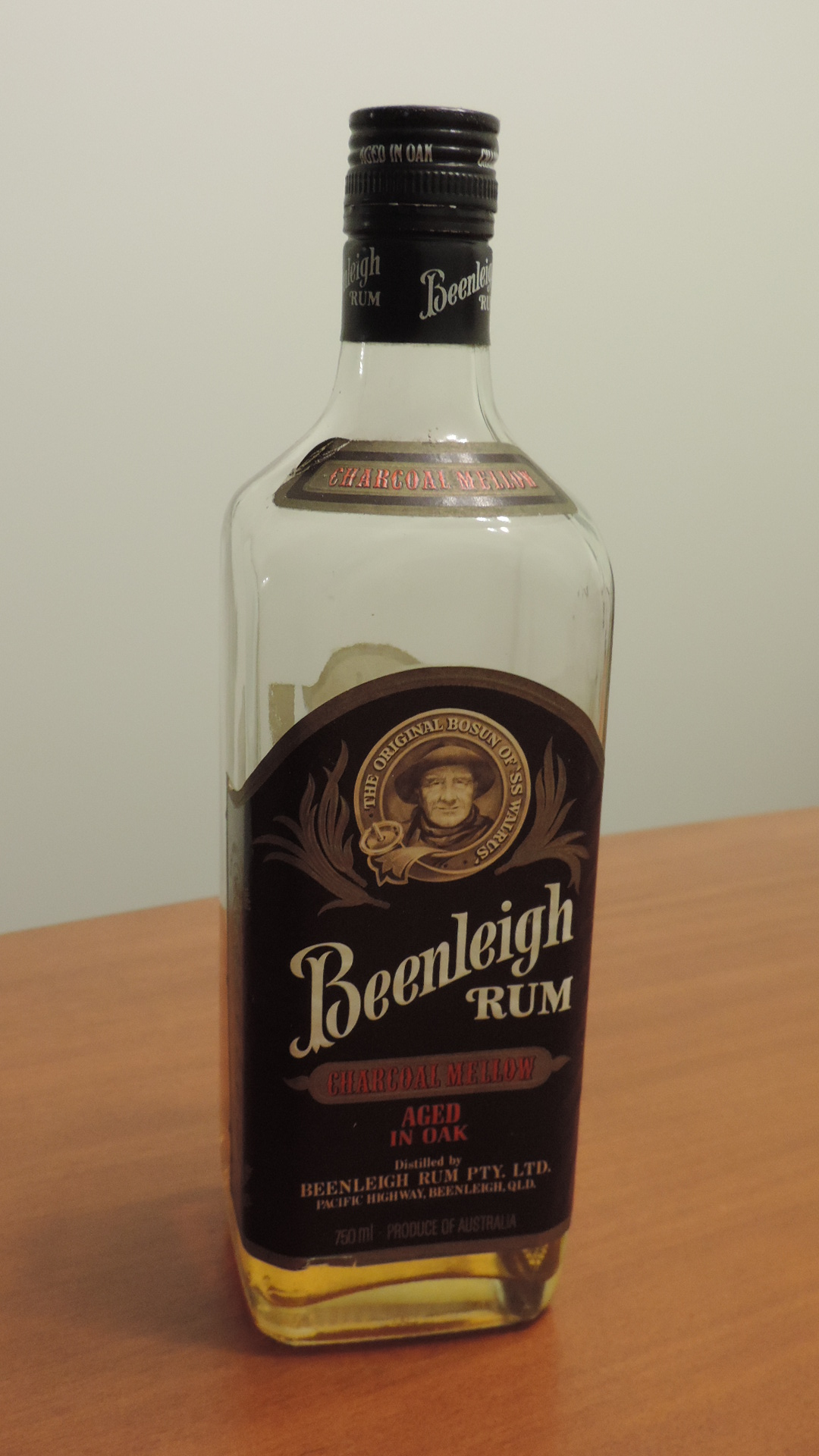
Bottle of Beenleigh Rum

Beenleigh Rum is among Australia's oldest brands of rum. It is produced at the heritage-listed Beenleigh Rum Distillery in the suburb of Eagleby (formerly part of Beenleigh) in the City of Logan, Queensland. Beenleigh Rum is 100 per cent Australian-made from local and imported ingredients and is available in 700 ml Dark Rum aged for 5 years, 700 ml White Rum and 700 ml Honey Liqueur Dark. All rum grades are fermented from Queensland molasses.

The distillery was developed to include a blending hall, bottling plant, warehouse and administration facilities, as well as a bar and restaurant. It is located on the banks of the Albert River and is a landmark on the river flats in the area.

== History ==
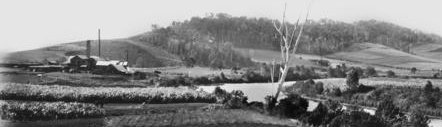
Beenleigh Rum Distillery, on the banks of the Albert River near Beenleigh, Queensland. ca. 1912

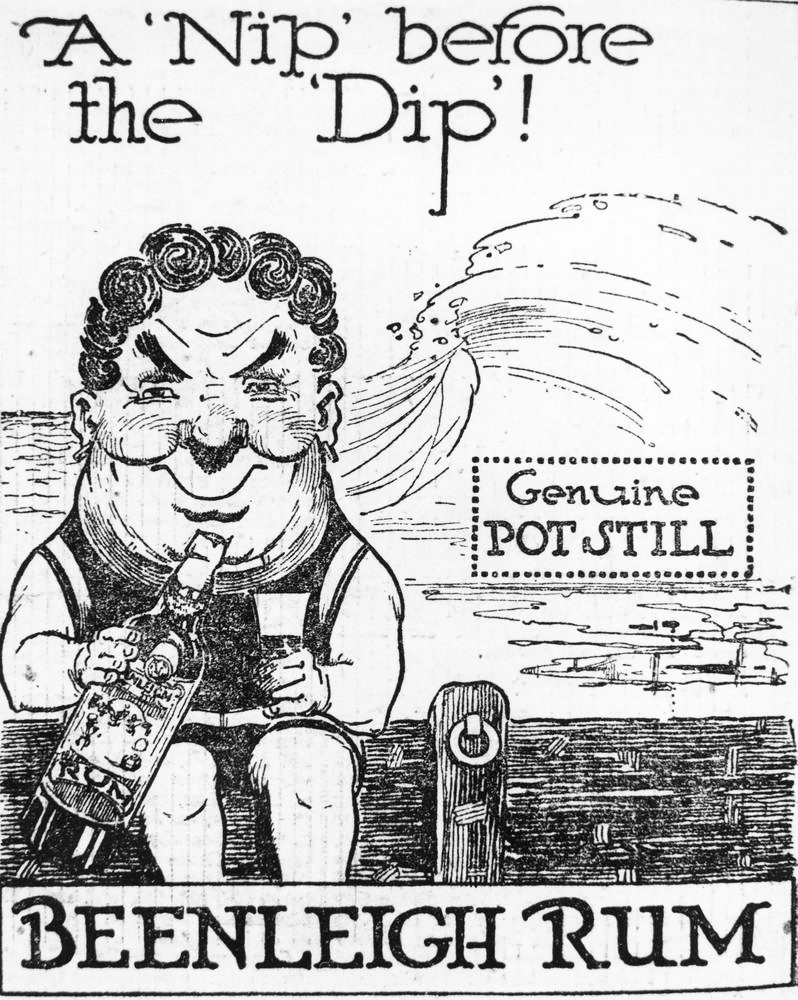
An advertisement for Beenleigh Rum in 1921

The Beenleigh Rum Distillery is the oldest registered distillery in Australia, and is a rare survivor of Australia's early sugar industry. It commenced operations in 1884 and was the legal successor to a floating moonshine still, the SS Walrus, which drifted between cane plantations and evading police in the early 19th century. The original proprietor, James Stewart, sold the boat's still to local entrepreneurs who used it to start the Beenleigh Rum Distillery. Between 1981 and 2005 a museum featuring displays on the history of sugar and rum production in the Beenleigh area was open at the distillery. The stills, vats and photos were relocated to the Beenleigh Historical Village.

During the 1960s and 70s, Beenleigh outsold it largest rival, Bundaberg Rum. Over the years, it lost market share and rebranded under different guises after being sold to successive owners.

Stuart Gilbert reinvigorated the brand in 2000 when he purchased the trademark and partnered with Malcolm Campbell, old master Distiller, to bring the brand back to life. In 2003, the Beenleigh Rum brand name was sold to Vok Beverages, a subsidiary of Adelaide based beverage company Bickford's Australia. Gilbert sold the brand in 2007. In May 2012 Vok Beverages purchased the Beenleigh Distillery and reconnected the brand and the distillery, which is back to being produced at the Beenleigh Distillery – using traditional Pot Distillation, in line with how it was produced by CSR in Australia from 1855 to 1986.

== Products ==
The Beenleigh Rum Distillery also produces Inner Circle Rum. Inner Circle was the exclusive preserve of Australia's Colonial Sugar Refining Company's board of directors and a handful of its prized clients, and even they were only entitled to the occasional bottle. Despite its limited availability, word of Inner Circle's unique flavour became legendary- whispered among rum enthusiasts the world over. Inner Circle Rum was lost when CSR sold the brand in 1986.

== See also ==
- List of rum producers
