= Excelsior Brigade Fife and Drum Corps =

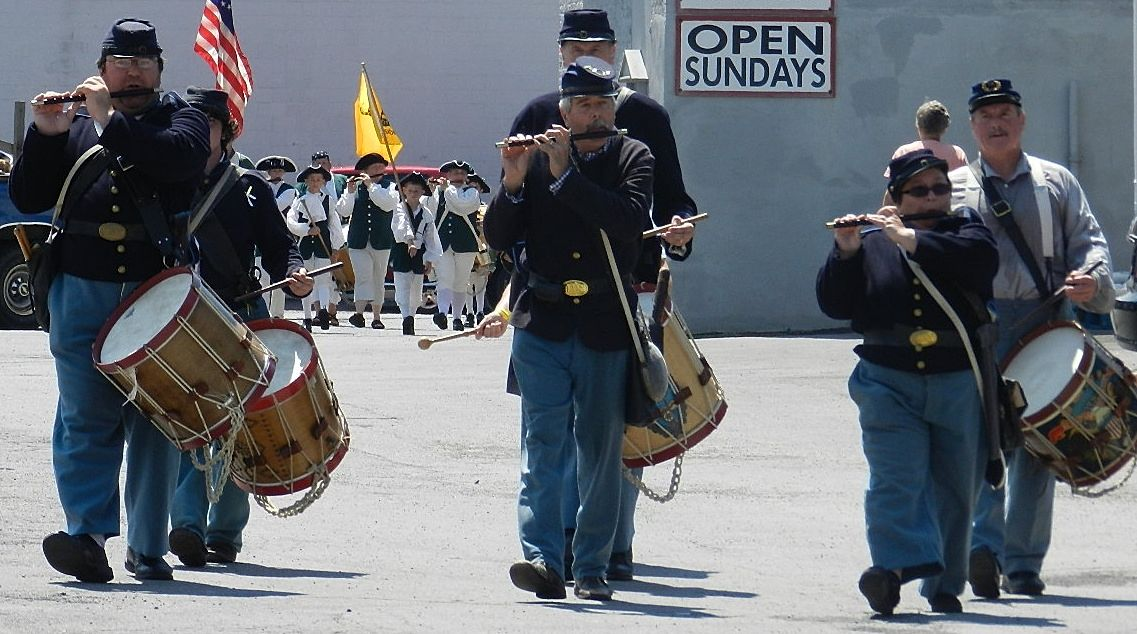
- Excelsior Brigade Fife and Drum Corps in Rochester, New York

The Excelsior Brigade Fife and Drum Corps (a.k.a. Excelsior Brigade of Fifes and Drums, Excelsior Brigade, or Western New York Field Music) was founded in 2000 as a combination Ancient Fife and Drum Corps and living history unit dedicated to authentically reproducing the sights and sounds of New York State volunteer militia field musicians as found during the American Civil War.

Each year, the group plays four to six living history events, marches in ten to fifteen fireman's and festival parades and performs in two to four Christmas concerts. The Excelsior Brigade wears authentic reproduction uniforms, accurately representing militia units as delivered to the front lines in early 1861. The leather brogans, wool shell jackets, trousers and kepi hat, the leather belts and cotton suspenders are quality pieces that bring Civil War field music onto 21st Century streets, allowing the corps to march off a fireman's parade and into a reenactment without missing a beat.

The corps plays a wide selection of tunes and duties as played during the war. Duties include reveille, breakfast call, pioneer's march and others. Songs include dozens of favorite tunes from the era with more added each season.

The high level of expertise and skill requires that the group practice year-round for the regular marching season.

Being a combination corps, of Ancient and Reenactor, the corps has some interesting features:

- constant open and anonymous access for members to all financial information
- no dues
- uniforma and instruments provided to members on a loan program
- free lessons
- sheet music and other resources available through the website

== See also ==
- Fife and drum blues
