= Dorf Clark Industries =

Dorf Clark Industries Limited
- Products: Sanitaryware, bathroom fixtures
- Parent: GWA Group
- Website: www.dorf.com.au

Dorf Clark Industries Limited (commonly Dorf) is a division of GWA Group and is an Australian manufacturer of taps and accessories, stainless sinks and tubs and commercial products.

== History ==
Caroma Dorf was formed in 2006 by GWA Group as the Bathroom Fixtures and Sanitaryware business, which is now home to a number of well-known brands including Dorf, Caroma, Fowler, Irwell, Stylus, Clark, Epure and Radiant.

Dorf has a major manufacturing facility in Penrith, New South Wales, and has sales offices in across Australia and New Zealand. Dorf also has agents in the Pacific Islands, South East Asia, Canada and the USA.
