= Australian work boot =

Style of work boot

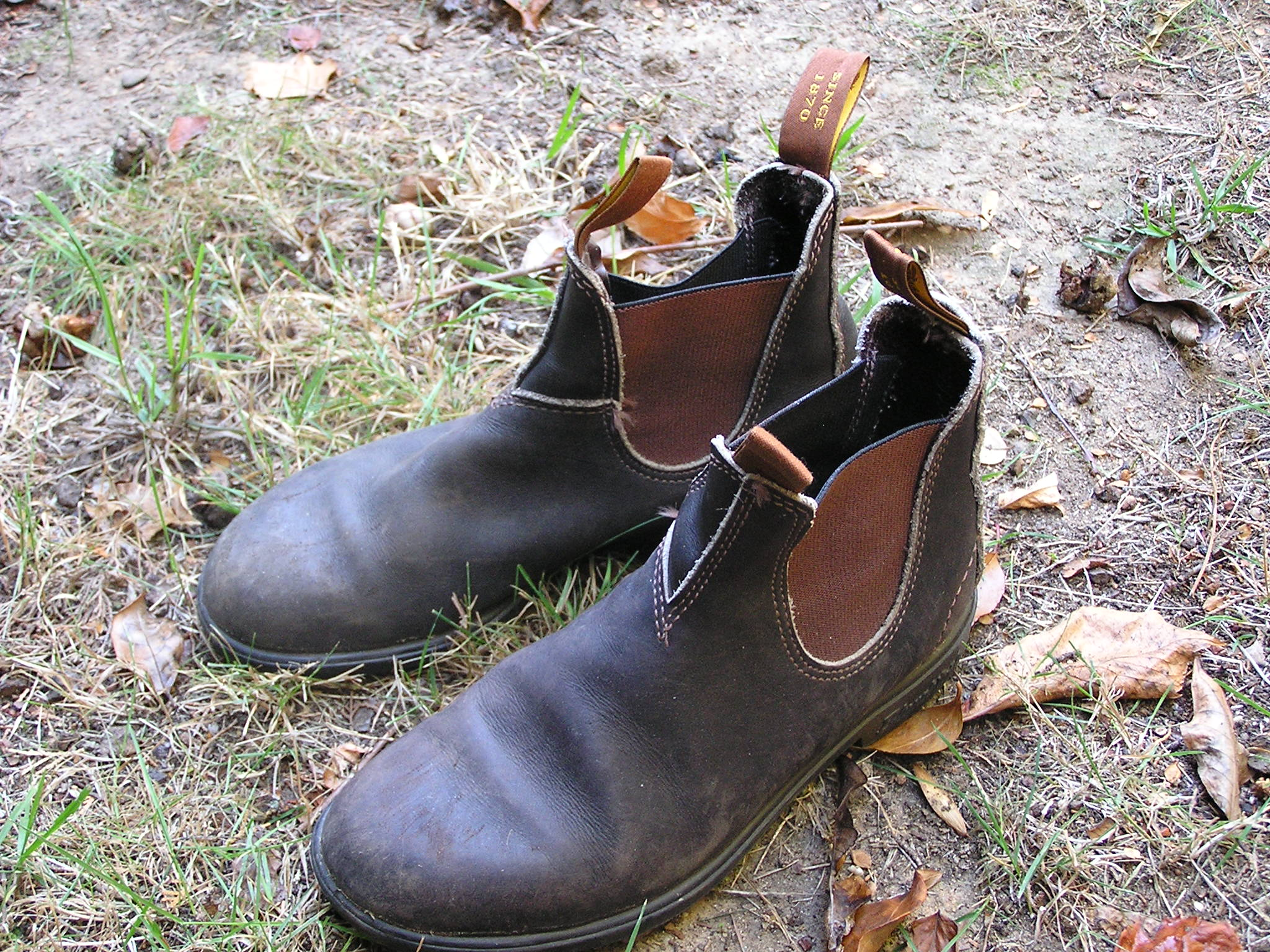
Blundstone elastic sided boots

An Australian work boot (or generically elastic-sided boot) is a style of work shoe, typically constructed with a leather upper bound together with elastic sides and pull tabs on the front and back of the boot. The shoe lacks a tongue, and laces, and often contains a steel toe cap for occupational health and safety reasons. When the shoe contains a steel cap they are often known as "safety boots" or "steel toe boots". The boots generally lack an inner lining. The sole is generally polyurethane and the leather uppers are treated to be resistant to hot water, fats and mild alkaline and acid solutions.

The elasticated side design, originally invented in England by Joseph Sparkes Hall in 1837, allows the wearer to put on or remove their boots without the hassle of laces, while enjoying the firm fit of lace-up boots. In addition due to the boot not using laces, the fit is less tight, allowing the foot to breathe, which is beneficial in warm weather. Additionally, the lack of a shoe tongue makes waterproofing the boot easier. The original English design, for urban use, became known as the Chelsea Boot in the 1960s. In 1932 R. M. Williams adapted this design for stockmen's boots. There are several Australian companies manufacturing boots in this classic style today. Some of the more popular brands are Blundstone, (Note: Perhaps the original dating back to 1870.) (Note: No longer made in Australia.) Rossi Boots, (Note: Established in 1910 and still manufactured in Australia.) R. M. Williams, Baxter Boots, (Note: Since 1850.) Redback Boots, Mongrel Boots , (Note: Victor Footwear, manufacturing in Australia since 1930.) and Steel Blue. In Australian English, the manufacturer's brand name is often associated generically with this style of boot, leading to the names Blunnies, RMs, Mongrels or Rossis.

The shoes are typically worn as safety boots in occupationally hazardous environments, as ordinary work boots for people whose work is occasionally hazardous and who need to enter hazardous sites, as formal dress boots, as riding boots, or for particular aesthetic purposes. In the last category, the Novocastrian dance ensemble Tap Dogs uses modified work boots as tap shoes.

== See also ==
- List of boots
- List of shoe styles
- Chelsea boots
- Riding boots
