= Alcocks =

Australian sports equipment manufacturer

- Company type: Family business
- Industry: Retail
- Genre: Cue sports
- Founded: 1853; 173 years ago
- Founders: Henry Upton Alcock
- Headquarters: Malvern East, Victoria, Australia
- Area served: Worldwide
- Products: Billiard tables, Billiard balls, Cue sticks, Racks
- Owner: George Taylor
- Parent: Alcocks Group
- Website: alcocks.com.au

Alcocks is one of the oldest Cue sports equipment manufacturers in Australia. The company was founded in 1853 in Melbourne.

== See also ==
- List of sporting goods manufacturers
- List of oldest companies in Australia
