= Brogan (shoes) =

Heavy, ankle-high leather shoe

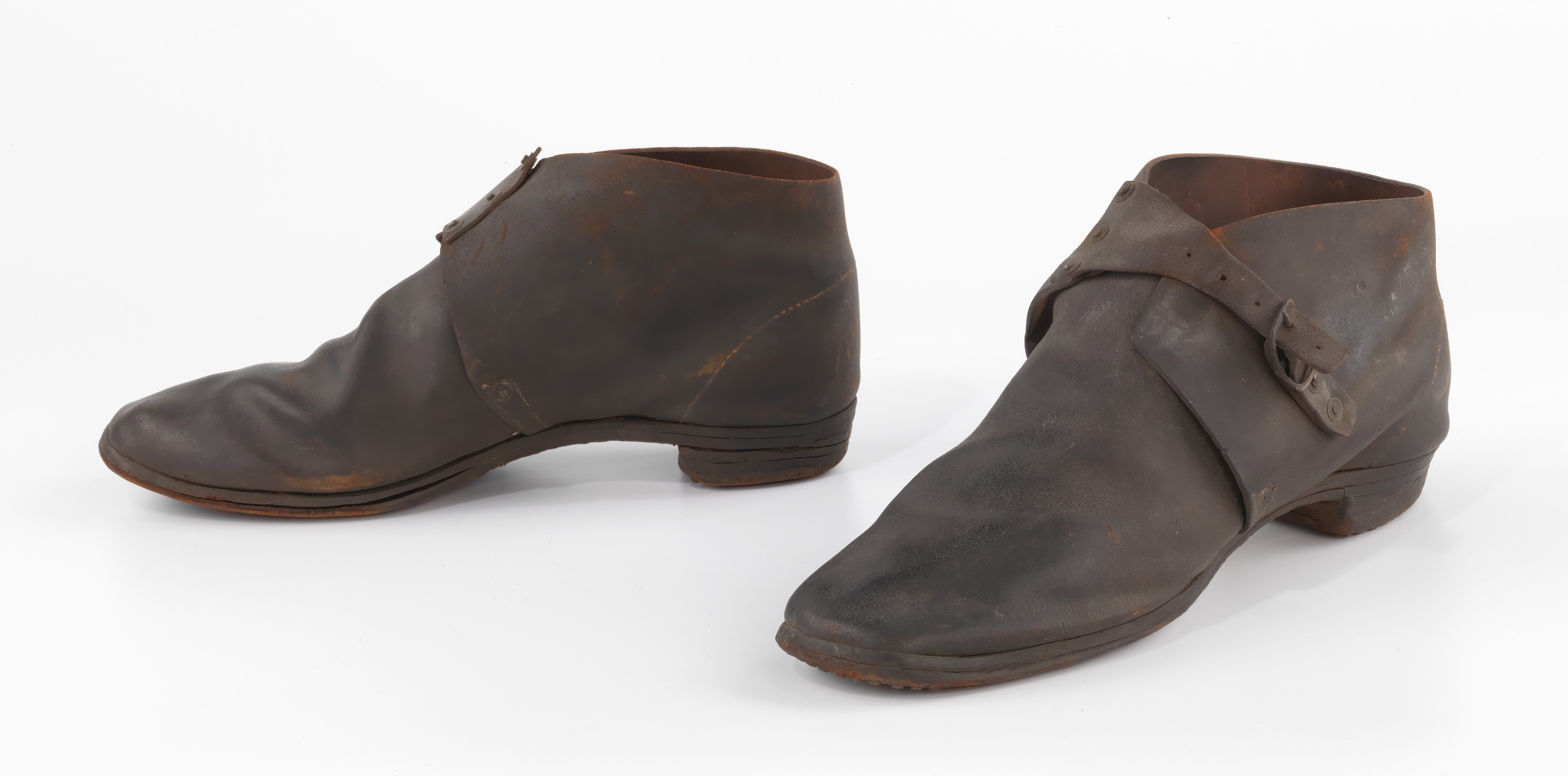
Pair of brogans, c. 1860–65.

A brogan is a heavy, ankle-high shoe or boot.

== History ==
Brogan-like shoes, called "brogues" (from Old Irish "bróc" meaning "shoe"), were made and worn in Ireland and Scotland as early as the 16th century, and the shoe type probably originated in Ireland. They were used by the Scots and the Irish as work boots to wear in the wet, boggy Scottish and Irish countryside. The word "brogue" is still used in Britain for a style of dress shoe, which may or may not have an ankle high top.

Brogans and brogan-like shoes and boots were adopted over time by various countries for wear by their military forces. English armies issued ankle-high boots at least as early as the English Civil War, and brogans may have been worn by some soldiers among both American and British forces during the American Revolutionary War. Both sides in the American Civil War issued them to their soldiers, and the U.S. Army issued hob-nailed brogans known as "trench boots" to U.S. soldiers during the First World War.

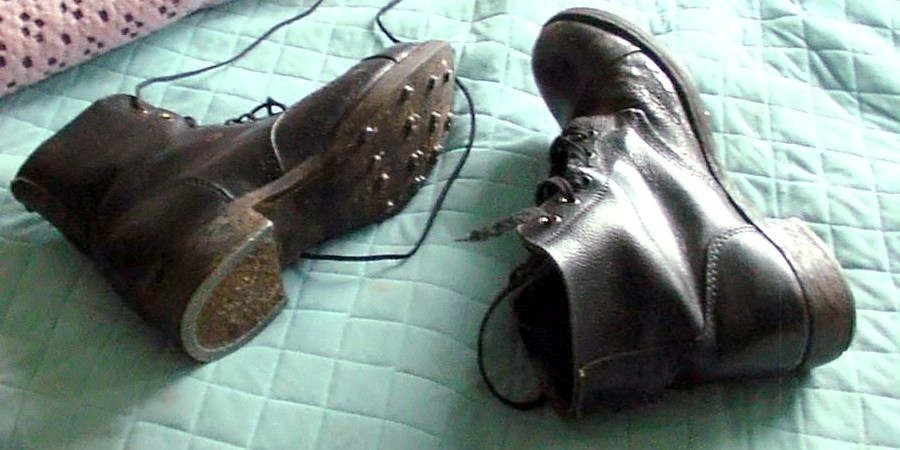
Pair of hobnailed boots

These replaced the 1904 Russet Service Shoe, a brogan of a construction unsuitable to trench warfare or field duty in general. An improved version of the trench boot, the 1918 trench boot, was nicknamed the "little tanks" because of their strong construction, and "Pershing boots" after American general John J. Pershing. The U.S. Army continued to issue brogans during WWII, and the U.S. Air Force issued them through the 1960s. Other armies, such as the German Army of the 1930s and World War II, and the British Army, have also issued brogan-type shoes, nicknamed "Ammunition Shoes".

== Description ==
The early brogans of the Scots and Irish were made of heavy untanned leather. The development of civilian brogans follows the general development of civilian footwear, with construction of brogan-style shoes benefiting from improvements in other styles of shoe, and with styles changing with the times. From the 1820s until before the American Civil War, American soldiers were issued brogans which were made on straight lasts; there was no "left" or "right" and they shaped themselves to the wearer's feet through use. These brogans were less expensive to manufacture than paired shoes, but they were very uncomfortable until broken in and often resulted in blisters. They were replaced in 1858 with an improved version used until the 1880s, generally known as Jeff Davis boots after Jefferson Davis, the Secretary of War who re-equipped the army in the 1850s. Military brogans were greatly improved during the First World War (see above), but at least in the United States, the lessons learned in that war were forgotten, and as World War II approached, the Army found itself reinventing the wheel, starting out once again with a garrison shoe that was ill-suited to field and combat duty. Modifications to brogans were unsuccessful, and eventually abandoned in favor of higher topped combat boots.

== See also ==
- List of shoe styles
- Blundstone
