= Raine & Horne =

Australian real estate company

- Company type: Proprietary
- Industry: Real estate
- Genre: Franchise
- Founded: 1883; 143 years ago, Sydney, Australia
- Founder: Tom Raine and Joseph Horne
- Headquarters: Sydney, New South Wales, Australia
- Area served: Australia, New Zealand, India, Malaysia, Fiji & United Arab Emirates
- Key people: Angus Raine
- Products: Real estate franchising
- Services: Real estate; Property management; Property sales; Auctions; Home loans and finance; Project development; Project marketing
- Owner: Each office is independently owned and controlled by its proprietors.
- Website: www.raineandhorne.com.au

Raine & Horne is an Australian real estate franchise group, consisting of distinct residential, commercial, rural and international holdings. It is one of Australia's oldest family-owned real estate firms and is one of the oldest private companies in the Southern Hemisphere.

== History ==
The company was established by Tom Raine and Joseph Horne in 1883 when they opened their firm at Wentworth Court, Elizabeth Street in Sydney.

By the 1970s, the Raine & Horne network stretched across Sydney, but driven by the enthusiasm of then chairman Max Raine, the Raine & Horne Board then decided to pursue a franchising business model, with its first franchised office opening in Liverpool, NSW in 1976.

The Raine family has been continually involved with the firm since its inception in 1883, and Raine & Horne is now into its fourth generation of family ownership under current Executive chairman Angus Raine.

The company employs thousands of people in a network of several hundred offices across New South Wales, Queensland, Victoria, South Australia, Western Australia, Tasmania, the Northern Territory and the Australian Capital Territory. Raine & Horne also has many offices across the globe, including strong presences in New Zealand, Malaysia and Dubai, cementing the company's position as one of the strongest real estate networks nationally and internationally.

== Rebranding ==
In October 2011, Raine & Horne announced a national re-brand initiative, which included an overhaul of all media, incorporating digital platforms, marketing, and advertising and office signage. The re-brand focused on bringing Raine & Horne's yellow and black branding in ways they thought innovative and saw the traditional colour palette replaced with a new combination of 'gold and dark charcoal'.

The re-brand included a distinctive ampersand symbol, which represents Raine & Horne's brand ideal, 'Positive Partnerships', which encompasses the relationships between 'vendors & buyers', 'agents & vendors', 'agents & buyers', and 'property managers & tenants'.

This was followed in June 2013 with the re-branding of Raine & Horne Commercial, which is now represented by a unique curve, and a striking contrast of yellow and black.

== See also ==
- List of oldest companies in Australia
