= Mountcastle & Sons =

Australian hat manufacturer

- Founded: 1835; 191 years ago
- Headquarters: Yeronga, Queensland, Australia
- Owner: Hancock & Gore Ltd
- Number of employees: 300 (2015)
- Website: mountcastle.com.au

Mountcastle & Sons is an Australian hat manufacturer. The company is associated with bush hats made of rabbit fur felt with wide brims that are worn in rural Australia.

Statesman Hats is owned by Mountcastle Statesman and was established in 1972 in Western Australia. It and was bought by Mountcastle in 1995.

Trutex, an independent school uniform brand, is owned by Mountcastle.

In 2019 Mountcastle acquired LW Reid.

== See also ==
- List of oldest companies in Australia
