= Webster Limited =

Australian business

- Type: Privately held company
- Industry: Food and Beverage Manufacturing
- Founded: 1831
- Founder: Alexander Webster
- Headquarters: Tasmania and Riverina, Australia
- Key people: Roderick Roberts, Chairman John HoskenCEO
- Products: Walnuts, Cotton, and Livestock
- Revenue: ▲ A$ 275 million (2017)
- Website: www.websterltd.com.au

Webster Limited is an Australian business founded in 1831 by Alexander Webster, just 28 years after Van Diemen's Land was settled. Founded as a traditional pastoral house, Webster Limited is now a diversified food and agribusiness. Webster Limited acquired the Riverina walnut assets from Gunns Limited in 2010. It is now Australia and the southern hemisphere's largest walnut grower through its ownership and/or management of more than 2,200ha of orchards in Tasmania and the Riverina. Webster has since diversified into cotton and livestock following their A$ 116 million purchases of the 40,000-hectare prime Riverina cropping aggregation, "Kooba," in 2010.

== Acquisition and delisting from ASX ==
The Canadian Public Sector Pension Investment Board (PSP Investments) has acquired all capital in Webster. PSP Investments has added Webster Limited assets to its stable Australian agricultural investments, including investments in the major Queensland-based nut producer Stahmann Farms Enterprises (SFE).

On 21 February 2020, PSP delisted Webster from the Australian Securities Exchange.

== See also ==
- List of oldest companies in Australia
