= GWA Group =

Australian household products company

GWA Group Limited
- Formerly: GWA International
- Company type: Public
- Traded as: ASX: GWA
- Founded: 1934
- Founder: Cyril Anderson
- Headquarters: Pinkenba, Australia
- Key people: Darryl McDonough (Chairman); Urs Meyerhans (Chief Executive Officer)
- Products: Consumer products
- Revenue: $399 million (2024)
- Operating income: $92 million (2024)
- Net income: $44 million (2024)
- Number of employees: 504 (June 2024)
- Subsidiaries: Caroma; Dorf Clark Industries
- Website: www.gwagroup.com.au

GWA Group Limited, formerly GWA International, is an Australian Securities Exchange listed company that distributes household consumer products.

== History ==
The origins of GWA can be traced to a trucking business established by Cyril Anderson in Toowoomba in 1934. By the 1970s it has diversified into importing Mazda vehicles. It was listed on the Australian Securities Exchange in May 1993. GWA closed its last remaining factory in 2017. This signaled the company's move from being a manufacturer to a purely import-based model.

== Brands ==
- Caroma is a designer, importer and distributor of domestic and commercial sanitaryware and bathroom products.
- Dorf Clark Industries is a principal designer, importer and distributor of tapware and associated accessories, stainless steel sinks and laundry tubs for both domestic and commercial applications.
- Methven was a New Zealand manufactured tapware and shower company. It acquired by GWA in 2019.

== Former brands ==
- Gainsborough is an Australian designer, manufacturer, importer and distributor of a comprehensive range of domestic and commercial door hardware and fittings, including security products. GWA Door Hardware, including Gainsborough, API Locksmith and Austral Lock among others, was sold to Allegion in 2018.
- Gliderol is a manufacturer and distributor of garage and industrial doors, motors, and gate opening motors, and devices. Only the Australian name and market was purchased from the owners in 2011 not the international rights. it was sold to Reliance Doors in July 2015.
- EcoSmart manufactures solar power equipment and solar water heaters. Divested, along with Dux hot water, to Japanese company Noritz.
- Brivis air conditioning divested to Rinnai.
- Hansa tapware divested to Argent.
