= Inner Circle Rum =

- Type: Rum
- Manufacturer: Vok Beverages
- Distributor: Vok Beverages
- Origin: Australia, worldwide
- Website: innercirclerum.com.au

Inner Circle Rum is a dark rum produced in Australia. The Inner Circle Rum brand name was sold to Vok Beverages, a subsidiary of Adelaide-based beverage company Bickford's Australia. As of 2011 the brand is still owned by the 100% Australian owned company.

== See also ==
- List of rum producers
