= Oliver Boots =

Australian footwear company

Oliver Footwear
- Industry: Footwear Manufacturing
- Founded: 1887; 139 years ago
- Founder: James Oliver and John Stevens
- Headquarters: Ballarat, Australia
- Products: Safety boots and Workwear
- Parent: Honeywell
- Website: www.oliver.com.au

Oliver Footwear is an Australian footwear manufacturing company, but their boots are made off shore. Oliver specialises in lightweight work boots. Oliver Work Boots originated in Ballarat Vic Australia in 1887 originally supplying boots for gold miners in the area.

In 2011 they were purchased by Kings Safety in Asia and in 2012 both the Kings and Oliver work boot brands were purchased by American company Honeywell to complement their safety PPE portfolio, since then the Oliver Work Boot Brand is sold worldwide wide including USA, NZ, Asia and UAE.

The Oliver brand can be found at most work wear stores including Blackwoods, Totally Work Wear, Hip Pocket Workwear, independent safety shops and Safety Quip stores.

In Australia and New Zealand Oliver still employs a team of Sales Managers, Product Development, Testing and Compliance, accounting and Marketing staff.

The Oliver Footwear brand is sold predominantly to Mining, Oil and Gas, construction, warehousing and government markets. Their best selling styles include the All Terrain 45 & 55 zip sider series.

In Nov 2024 it was announced that Oliver Boots was being purchased from Honeywell to Global PPE leader Protective Industrial Products inc. a portfolio of Odyssey Investment Partners including the Honeywell PPE brand globally . Protective Industrial Products own various safety brands including Paramount Safety, Puma Safety Boots and Bisley Workwear.

== See also ==
- List of oldest companies in Australia
