= Steel Blue (company) =

Australian footwear manufacturer

- Company type: Privately held company
- Industry: Footwear Manufacturing
- Founded: 1995; 30 years ago
- Headquarters: Malaga, Perth, Western Australia, Australia
- Products: Safety boots and Workwear
- Building details

General information
- Coordinates

Steel Blue is an Australian footwear manufacturing company, specialising in lightweight work boots.

== See also ==
- Australian work boot
- Rossi Boots
