= Saxbys Soft Drinks =

Australian soft drink company

- Saxbys Soft Drinks premises in Taree, New South Wales.
- Trade name: Saxbys
- Type: Private
- Industry: Beverage
- Founded: 1864 (162 years ago) in Sydney, Australia
- Founder: George Saxby
- Headquarters: Taree, Australia
- Area served: Queensland; Northern New South Wales
- Products: Soft drinks, ginger beer, sarsaparilla
- Number of employees: Around 50
- Website: www.saxbys.com.au

Saxbys is an Australian soft drink brand and one of Australia's oldest continuously operating soft drink manufacturers. It was founded in Sydney, Australia in 1864 by George Saxby. The company remains under family ownership with his great-great-grandson Ian Turner now leading the company.

== History ==
George Saxby was born in 1836 in Kent, England and migrated with his family to Australia in 1839. Originally a stonemason, he developed an interest in the production of aerated drinks and began making cordials and soft drinks. In 1864, Saxby founded his company, Saxbys, and established his first drinks factory in Chatham (now part of Taree), where he produced beverages including ginger beer. Saxby would often personally make deliveries and served the Manning region including its small townships from Gloucester up to Lake Cathie. He was also involved in the local community and served in Taree's council as well as having been its mayor for two terms. By the early 1900s, George Saxby passed over the company to his sons, Dolph and Edwin.

In 1913, the company entered a partnership with G. A. Coleman to form "Saxby and Coleman" and their factory was situated on Albert Street, Taree. The partnership later ended, with Coleman leaving the business around 1919. During World War 2, Saxbys faced hardship as it struggled to find enough steel for its bottle caps. The company also had setbacks in 2008 after Asahi bought the Schweppes brands in Australia and did not renew its existing contract with Saxbys. According to Mr Turner, a descendant of George Saxby, the contract had accounted for approximately a third of the company's business. The company is now in its fifth generation of family ownership.

== See also ==
- List of oldest companies in Australia
- List of soft drinks by country
