= Fowler Potteries =

Australian ceramics manufacturer

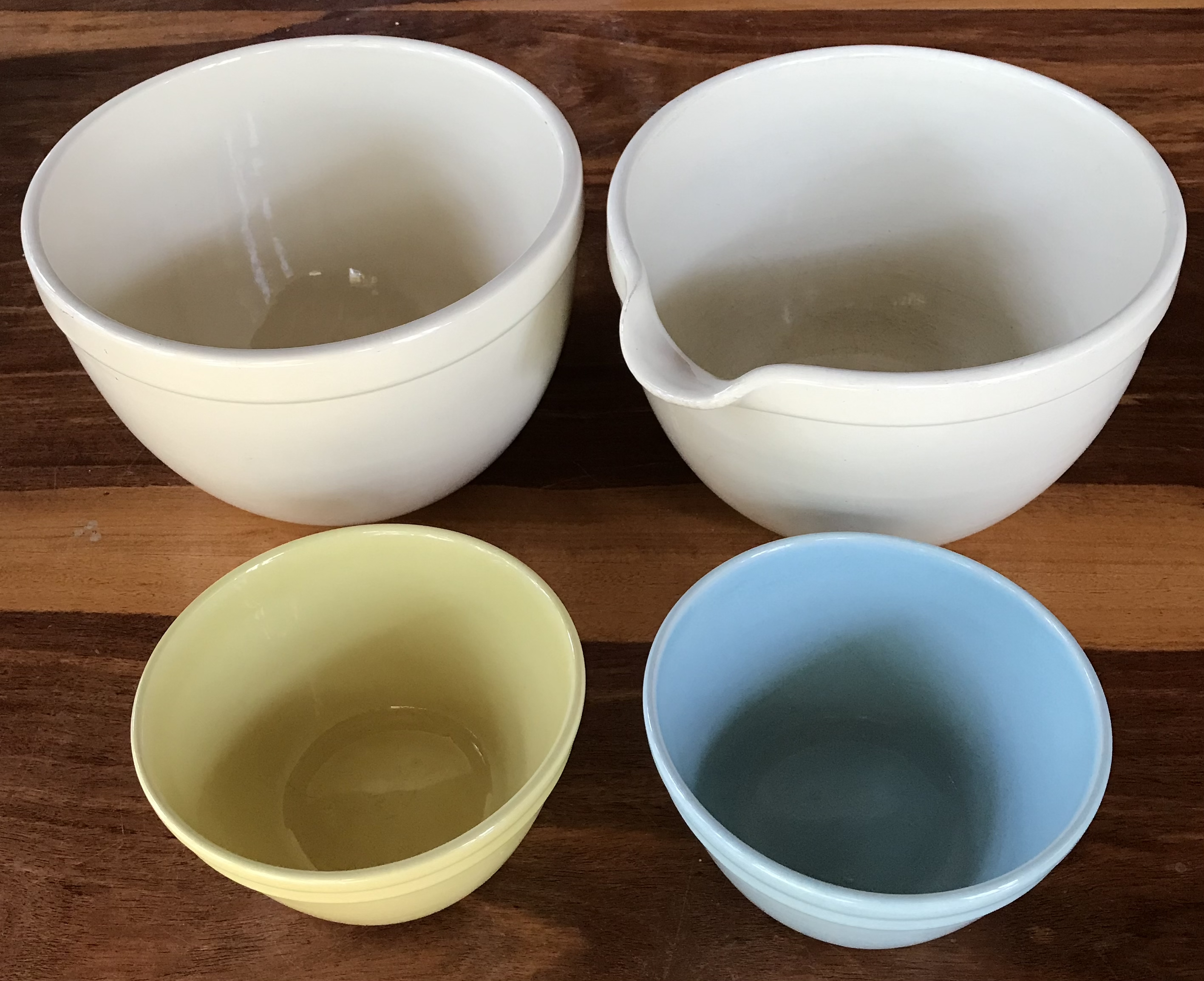
A selection of Fowler Ware

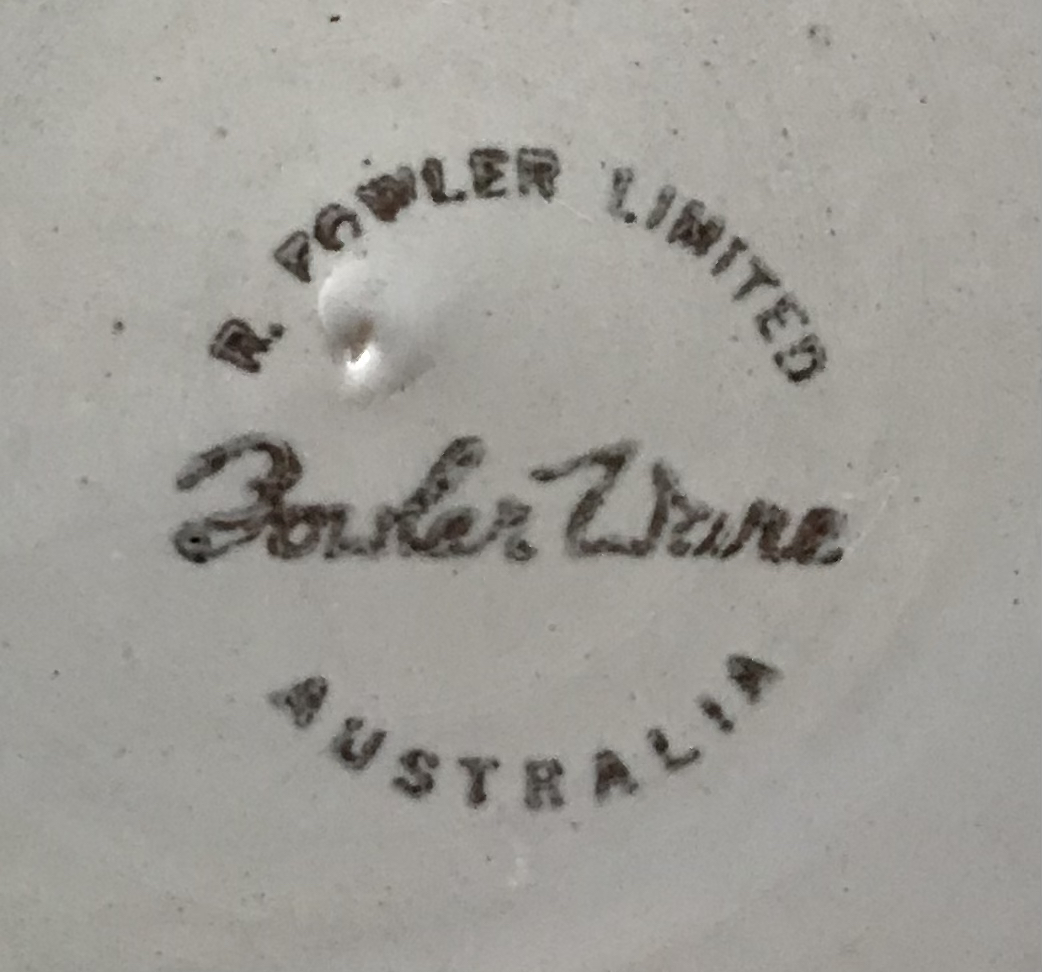
Stamp on Fowler Ware bowl

Fowler Potteries, later R. Fowler Sydney and R. Fowler Limited, was a manufacturer of ceramics in the colony of New South Wales, and in the Commonwealth of Australia, which still exist as the brand name Fowler within Caroma. Fowler is nominally the oldest still existing manufacturer of ceramics in Australia.

== History ==
Fowler Potteries were founded in 1837 by Enoch Fowler in Parramatta near Sydney. In 1848 Fowler moved to Glebe, where Fowler made ginger beer bottles and kitchen utensils. In 1860 Enoch Fowler bought a machine for making four‑inch drainpipes; this became the mainstay of the works. In 1865 Fowler moved to Camperdown. Fowler grew rapidly when Sydney expanded, and made bricks, fire bricks, tiles och ceramic kitchen utensils.

Enoch Fowler's son Robert Fowler was manager of the business from 1873, and he inherited the business in 1879. After Robert Fowler's death in 1906, production was moved to Marrickville. Fowler became a public company in 1919 or 1922, under the name namn R. Fowler Limited. Fowler also made electric insulators.

In 1919 the number of employees was 400. Additional factories were set up in Thomastown, Melbourne in 1927 and in Lithgow. The Great Depression severely affected R. Fowler Ltd. In 1936 Fowler introduced Fowler Ware, a range of ceramic kitchen utensils, mainly bowls; Fowler Ware was successful, and the company's fortunes were restored. Fowler Pottery ware from the nineteenth and twentieth centuries is today collectable.

In 1968 Fowler was bought by another company, and was subdivided in 1982. One division and the name were sold to James Hardie; Fowler became the Fowler Bathroom Products Division of James Hardie, producing exclusively bathroom products. In 1997 Caroma bought Fowler from James Hardie.

Fowler potteries and Fowler ware were renowned for their standard colours on offer for bathroom and sanitation ware, mainly in lemon, blue, pink and green. By 1983, these colours had been discontinued as part of the company having been subsumed and consolidated into James Hardie.

in 1983 the Victorian manufacturing plant of Fowler was closed. The Toilet pans were bearing the brand name Caroma by 2017 when manufacturing ceased in Australia, moving to overseas third-party manufacturing facilities on 24 February, 2017.

== See also ==
- List of oldest companies in Australia
