= Le Coq Sportif =

French company producing sports equipment

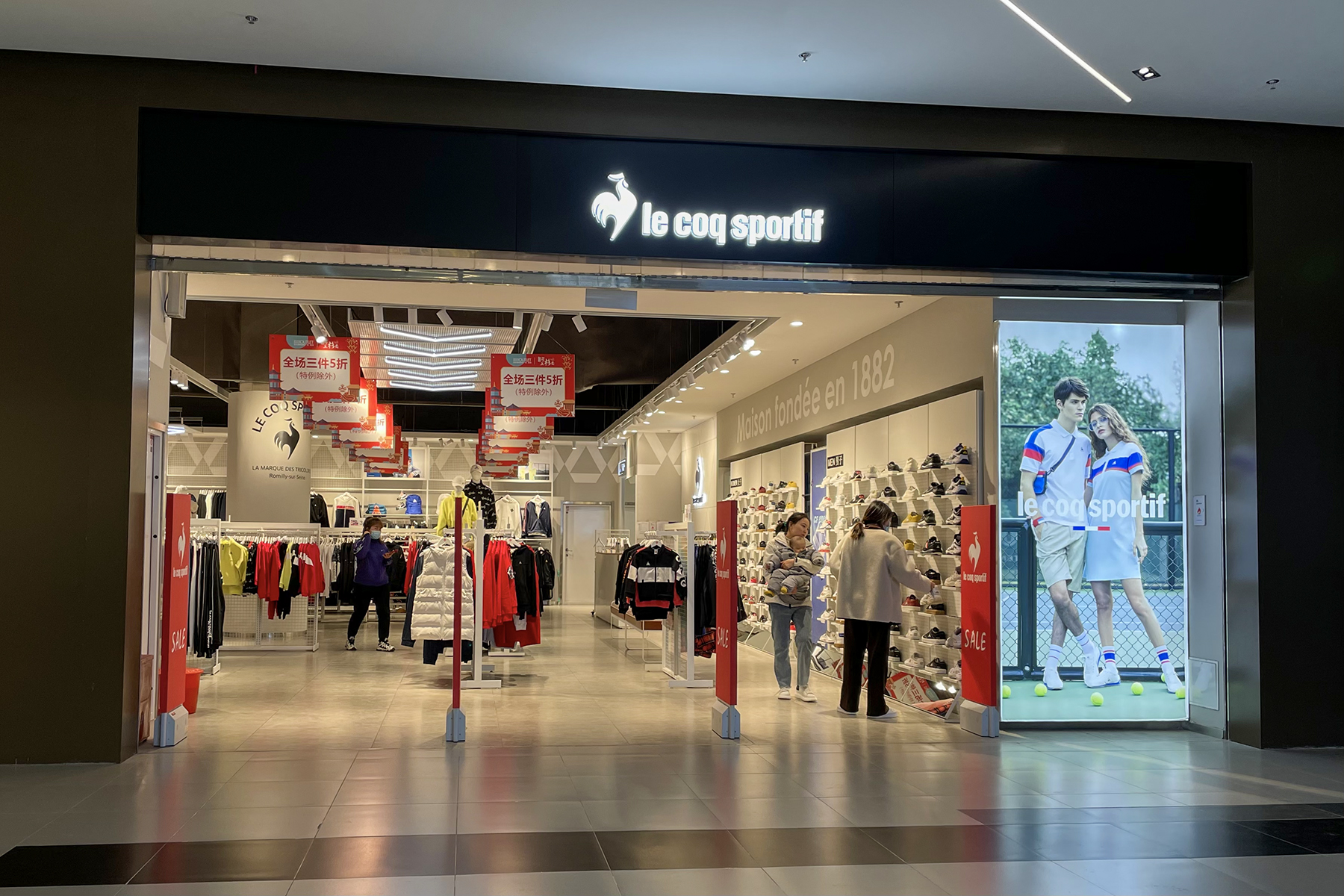
- Le Coq Sportif store in Zhengzhou, China
- Type: Subsidiary
- Industry: Textile; Sports equipment
- Founded: 1882; 144 years ago
- Founder: Émile Camuset
- Headquarters: Entzheim, France
- Products: Sportswear, clothing, footwear
- Revenue: ▲€132.2 million (2019)
- Parent: Airesis S.A.
- Website: lecoqsportif.com

Le Coq Sportif (French pronunciation: [lə kɔk spɔʁtif], "the athletic rooster") is a French sportswear and sports equipment manufacturer based in Entzheim. Founded in 1882 by Émile Camuset, the brand first issued items branded with its now-famous rooster trademark in 1948. The company's name and trademark are derived from the Gallic rooster, a national symbol of France.

Nowadays, Le Coq Sportif is a subsidiary of Airesis S.A., a Swiss-based investment company that holds a 69% stake. The current range of products by Le Coq Sportif includes sportswear, casual clothing and footwear.

== History ==
The company was established by Émile Camuset in 1882, initially within the woolen industry and then entering into the sportswear business, with some sources stating that it was his son who encouraged him to do it.

The Camuset family started manufacturing sports clothing in its factory in Romilly-sur-Seine in north central France, releasing its first catalogue (which mostly included cycling jerseys) in 1929. Ten years later, the company launched the first tracksuit ever, the chándal (also known as "the Sunday clothing").

Le Coq Sportif reached its peak in the 1950s, with its first huge success in 1951 when the brand signed a deal to make the yellow jersey for the Tour de France. That jersey had been introduced in 1919 but rejected by riders who didn't want to be so visible to rivals. The company was Louison Bobet's jersey supplier when he won three consecutive Tours from 1953–1955. During those years, LCS also signed agreements to be the official kit provider for the France national football team (from 1955) and rugby teams. The company also signed an agreement with the French Olympic Committee so athletes wore LCS sportswear at the 1960 Summer Olympics at Rome.

The company redesigned its logo (the triangular shape with a rooster inside) and put it onto the yellow jersey for the first time in 1966; it was one of the first sports manufacturers to make its logo visible. By 1966 Le Coq Sportif was the biggest sports brand in France and that same year the company signed a deal with Adidas to produce the three stripes clothing products in France. Terms of the contract ruled that Adidas focused on footwear while LCS took over of textile products.

Former logo, used (with slight variations) from 1968 (2009-2010 variant shown), when an oversimplified version of the rooster was featured, until 2012. The rooster seen here was first seen in 1973, albeit only without the triangle, and would later get complemented by a triangle and the company's name in lowercase from 1975, with a color change happening in 2009. This logo remains in use in China, South Korea and Japan.

In the early 1970s, Adidas, dissociated with its share in the market, began to sell textile products, realising that the Camuset family had registered the three stripes symbol in France. That led to a legal battle between the two companies that almost caused the demise of LCS. As Adidas lost the lawsuit, it struck back against the French company with the objective to push it out of the business. Adidas signed a sponsorship agreement with Eddy Merckx, the raising star of cycling. That quick move and some bad decisions by the Camuset family made LCS lose a substantial piece of the market and Adidas offered to buy the company, which would have regained ownership of the three stripes in France as part of the deal. The offer was declined by Mirielle Camuset –Emile's daughter– more based on her political thoughts (as she had been a member of the French resistance against Germany during the World War II) than a commercial point of view. The French government became aware of LCS' critical situation, and appointed entrepreneur André Guelfi to take over the company and save it.

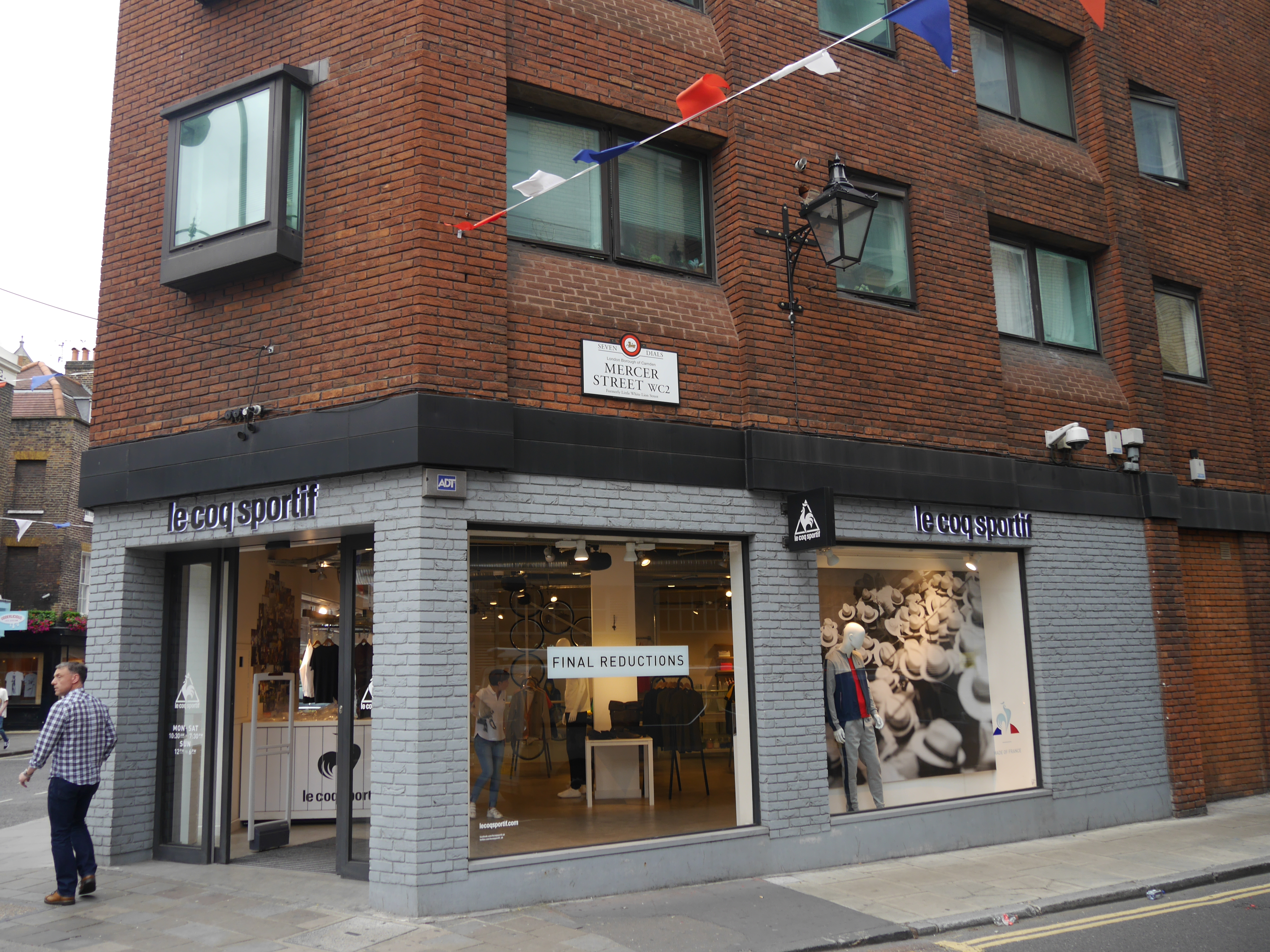
Le Coq Sportif shop at Mercer Street, London, pictured in 2016

Guelfi meet Horst Dassler (who was in charge of Adidas by then) and they secretly agreed to Adidas would buy a controlling stake in LCS. In return, Dassler would give help and assistance to make LCS a big company again. In the 1980s, Adidas's support allowed LCS reaching new audiences when tennis player Yannick Noah won the French Open in 1983, wearing Le Coq Sportif apparel. The rooster logo also appeared on the jerseys of Peugeot and Renault teams, and cyclist Bernard Hinault. During Hinault's win at the World Championship, he wore an LCS jersey and Adidas shoes.

The passing of Dassler in 1987 put both companies in a critical situation. After being taken over by French entrepreneur Bernard Tapie (then involved in a match-fixing scandal in French football), Le Coq Sportif was sold to US company Brown Shoe, with Japanese firm Descente also taking rights over LCS to develop a golf line. By 1999 the company did not have a single cyclist in its range of sponsored athletes. The company was taken over by another entrepreneur, Oliver Jacques, who would be then imprisoned after charges involving counterfeit Adidas and Nike products.

After a long time of financial troubles and scandals, the company was relaunched in 2005 by Robert Louis-Dreyfus (coincidentally the former CEO of Adidas), through a Swiss investment company, Airesis. It was relocated on its original home in 2010, refurbishing the original factory in Romilly-sur-Seine, with production now centralised in France. LCS returned to sponsor cycling teams. In 2012, the company restarted its partnership with the Tour de France.

=== 2020s ===
On 22 November 2024, majority owner Airesis placed Le Coq Sportif into receivership, aiming to reorganize the company: Le Coq Sportif produced uniforms for the French Olympic and Paralympic teams at the 2024 Summer Olympic and Paralympic Games respectively, but increased publicity at the Games did not stop Le Coq Sportif's consecutive quarterly financial losses. Furthermore, the French Rugby Federation sued Le Coq Sportif in September 2024, claiming €5.3 million in unpaid sponsorship fees. The company also took out two emergency loans in 2023 – €12.5 million from the French government, and €2.9 million from the Paris Organising Committee for the 2024 Olympic and Paralympic Games.

== Sponsorships ==
=== History ===
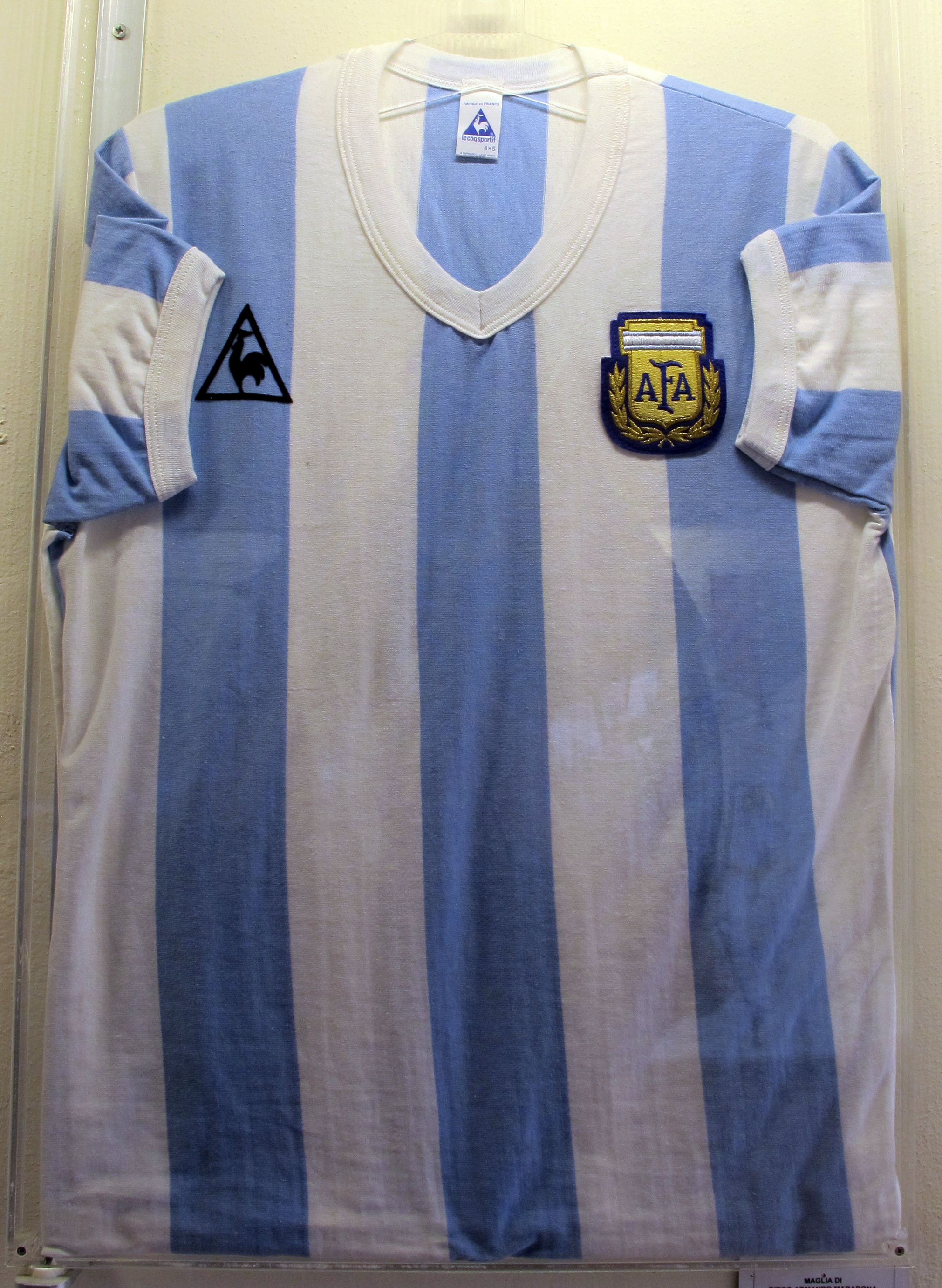
Le Coq Sportif Argentina jersey worn by Diego Maradona at the 1982 FIFA World Cup.

The company sponsors the Quick Step-Innergetic and Team Milram cycling teams. Le Coq Sportif also supplied kits to the Tottenham Hotspur team that won the FA Cup in 1981 and 1982, Aston Villa 1982 team that won the European Cup, Chelsea (1981-1986), Sunderland (1981-1983), Sheffield United (1997-2000 and 2002-2009) and Everton (1983-1986 and 2009-2012) and AFC Ajax of Amsterdam (1/1973-6/1977 and 7/1980-12/1984); the FIFA World Cup winning teams of Italy in 1982 and Argentina in 1986. The company also sponsored Brazilian club Sport Club Internacional in 1982. The club won the traditional Joan Gamper Trophy at the Camp Nou in Barcelona while using Le Coq uniforms. Internacional also won the 1982 Gaúcho Championship wearing Le Coq. Fluminense Football Club is another Brazilian club that dressed Le Coq Sportif's kits in the 80s and won the National League title in 1984 as well as a Campeonato Carioca threepeat in 1983, 1984 and 1985. Its largest recent success in Brazil came by designing the Atlético Mineiro uniforms between 2019 and 2021, including the kit of the team that won the Brazilian Championship the latter year, ending a 50-year drought, also winning the 2021 Brazilian Cup and reaching the Copa Libertadores 2021 semifinals.

In other sports, tennis player Arthur Ashe wore Le Coq Sportif when winning the 1975 Wimbledon Championship. The company then launched a sneakers line, the Arthur Ashe shoe. Belgian Justine Henin also wore LCS when she played the 2001 Wimbledon final. South Korean golfer Yang Yong-eun wore a Le Coq Sportif shirt on the last day of the PGA Championship in 2009, which he won.

Le Coq Sportif hired local designers in Japan and Korea to complete and adapt the global collection for local market. They also signed some partnerships to release special models. Le Coq Sportif in Japan associated with Sou to create handmade shoes and tabi. They also released a line of shoes with designer Kamishima Chinami. For Le Coq Sportif Korea, the partnership was made with the car manufacturer Peugeot to create a shoe named the "Peugeot 207cc." The shoes were recalled in 2009 for a product fault, when the fabric was exposed to water the shoe's stitching would come apart. This in turn lost Le Coq Sportif millions in revenue. In 2012, Le Coq Sportif returned to professional cycling, and manufactured the jerseys for the Tour de France under a new five-year contract with Amaury Sport Organisation.
