= Vok Beverages =

Drink manufacturer in South Australia

- Industry: Beverage industry
- Founded: 2002
- Headquarters: Salisbury South, South Australia, Australia
- Products: Alcoholic beverages
- Owner: Bickford's Australia
- Parent: Bickford's Australia
- Website: www.vok.com.au

Vok Beverages is a drink manufacturer in South Australia.

== Earlier history ==
Before the acquisition by Bickford's of the brandname, Vok was a brand of a range of liqueurs manufactured by Jan Vok, a Dutch company, popular in Papua pre-war. Immediately after WWII sixteen flavours, from Advocaat to White Curaçao were being imported into Australia, and distributed by Stephen King Pty Ltd of Sydney.

An early marketing exercise by the company was the "Vok Thousand", an award of £1000 (one thousand pounds — the price of a mid-range car) to a Test cricketer, on the basis of points accumulated over the 1950–51 season. Len Hutton was the inaugural winner.

The company, which advertised prominently in the Dutch language Australia newspapers, made the distinctive shape of its bottles a "selling point". The company was still advertising similar products in the "distinctive bottle" in November 1978.

== Drinks ==
- Vok Liqueurs
- Aqua Pura Water
- Bearded Lady Bourbon
- Beenleigh Rum
- Black Bottle Brandy
- Boronia marsala
- Cawsey's Grenadine
- El Toro
- Frigate Rum
- Galway Pipe port
- HI NRG Vodka & Energy Premix
- Infused Rush
- Inner Circle Rum
- Olympus Ouzo
- Real McCoy Bourbon
- Rebellion Bay Spiced Rum
- Ruski Lemon
- Three Oaks Cider
- TST Tolleys Brandy
- UDL
- Vickers Gin

== See also ==
- Bickford's Australia - sister company.
- List of South Australian manufacturing businesses
