= Stuart Alexander & Company =

Stuart Alexander
- Company type: Private
- Industry: Marketing and importing
- Founded: 1884
- Headquarters: Pyrmont, New South Wales, Australia
- Key people: Garry Browne AM, Chairman; Caroline Waite, CEO
- Products: Stuart Alexander imports, markets, distributes and owns a range of fast-moving consumer goods and brands.
- Number of employees: 155
- Website: http://www.stuartalexander.com.au/

Stuart Alexander & Co Pty Ltd is a privately owned, wholly Australian company founded in 1884. Stuart Alexander imports, markets, distributes and owns a range of fast-moving consumer goods (FMCGs) and brands throughout Australia.

== See also ==
- List of oldest companies in Australia
