= Baxter Boots =

Australian shoe company

- Native name: Baxter Boots & Shoes
- Industry: Footwear
- Founded: 1850
- Headquarters: Goulburn, Australia
- Website: baxterfootwear.com.au

Baxter Boots is an Australian shoes producer founded in 1850 and headquartered in Goulburn, New South Wales.

== History ==
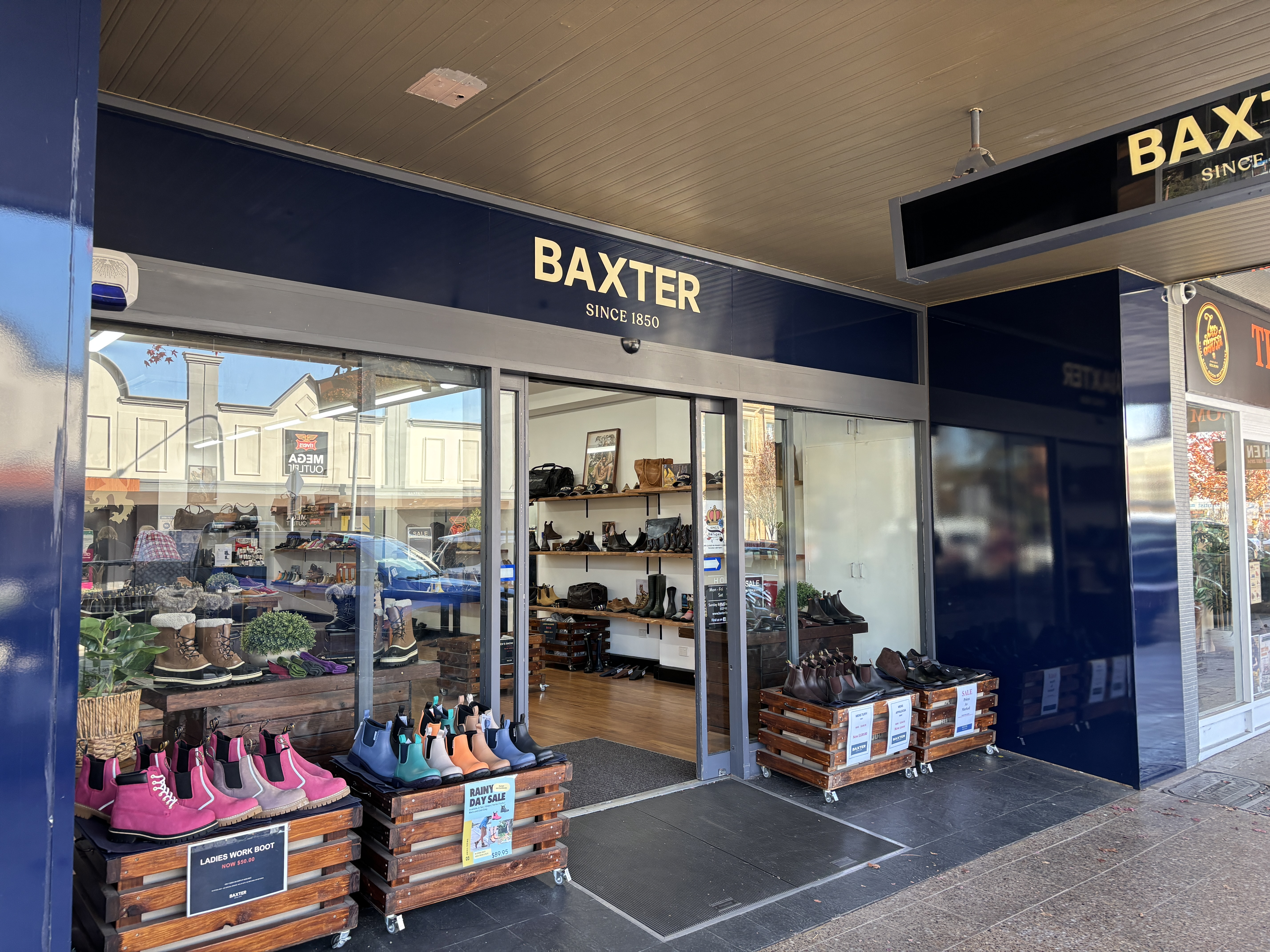
Baxter's shop in Goulburn during 2025

In 1850 the company was founded by William Teece in Goulburn, which was bought by Henry Baxter in 1885. Since then has been managed by the Baxter family and today it sells about 90,000 pairs annually. Its boots are most popular with the horse riding community.

Baxter Boots was a large company between the early to mid 1900s, and employed hundreds of workers at Goulburn. It experienced severe financial problems during the 1960s, and went into administration. The firm later received a loan from the New South Wales Government, but did not leave administration until 1979. It re-entered administration between 1984 and 1988 after the acquisition of a nursing shoes business proved unsuccessful.

After tariffs protecting the Australian clothing and footwear industry were phased out over the 1970s and 1980s, Baxter moved most of its footwear production overseas. As of 2015, 90 percent of the firm's boots and shoes were produced in China, with the rest being made at its factory in Goulburn. At this time the company was seeking to enter the export market, with a focus on the United States.

== See also ==
- List of oldest companies in Australia
