= Émile Camuset =

French clothing merchant

Émile Camuset was a French clothing merchant in the 19th century.

He was the founder of the Le Coq Sportif sports equipment company. He began the company in 1882 with the opening of a small hosiery store in Romilly-sur-Seine, in a part of the Champagne region called the Aube.

He is cited as the original creator of sweatpants. Camuset began developing new lines of clothing which incorporated cotton ribs, brushed fleece and jersey. This was in contrast to many of the more traditional methods of clothing available at the time. The increased comfort and breathability were incorporated into the first items of sportswear.
