= Blundstone Footwear =

Australian footwear brand

- Type: Private
- Industry: Footwear
- Founded: 1870 in Hobart, Tasmania
- Founder: John Blundstone
- Headquarters: Hobart, Tasmania, Australia
- Area served: Worldwide
- Key people: John and Eliza Blundstone; Sylvanus Blundstone; William Blundstone; The Cane family James and Thomas Cuthbertson

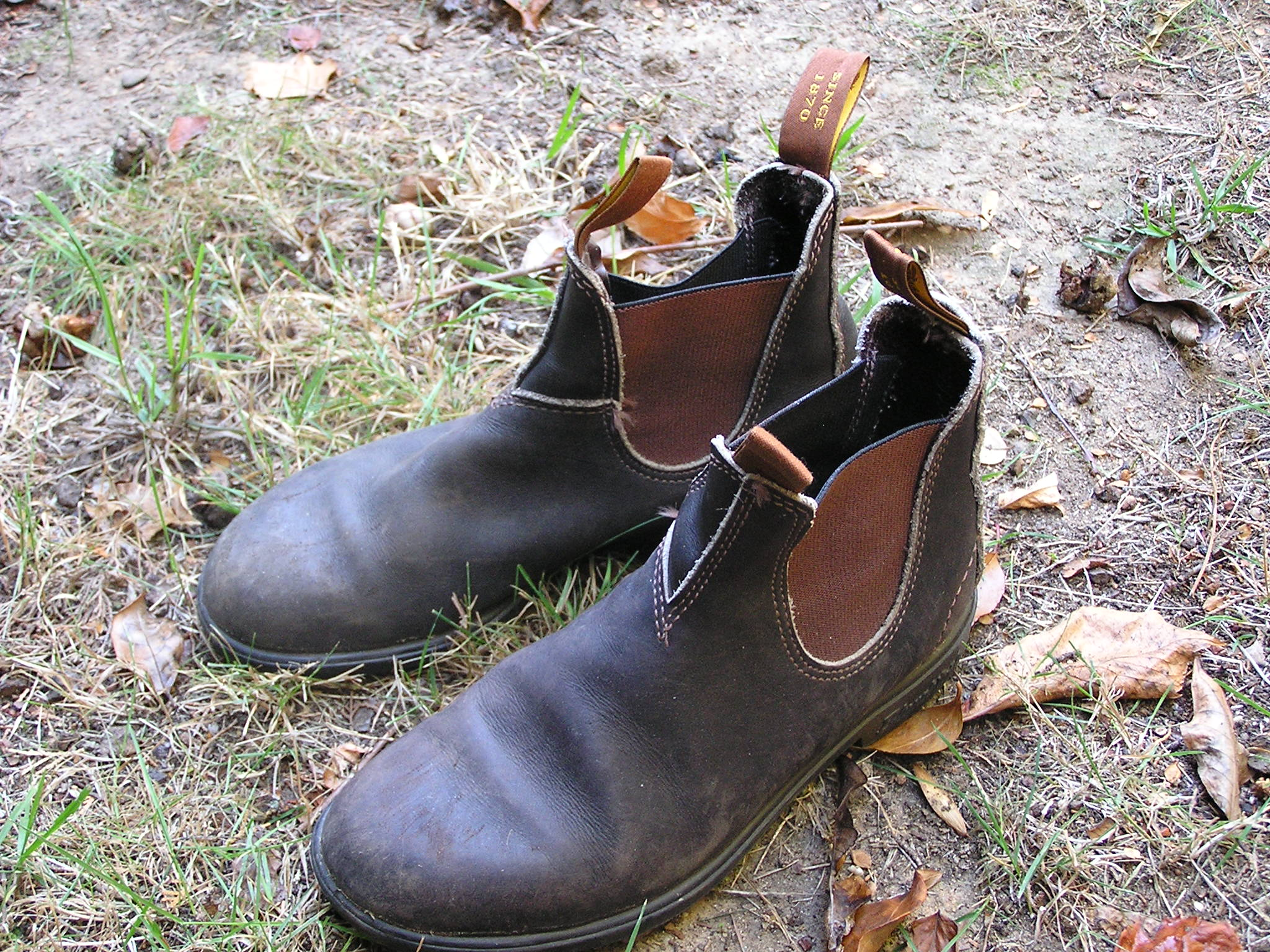
Blundstone elastic-sided boots

Blundstone Footwear (/ˈblʌndstən/ BLUND-stən) is an Australian footwear brand, based in Hobart, Tasmania, with most manufacturing being done overseas since 2007. The company's best-known product is its line of laceless, elastic-sided, ankle-length boots.

== History ==
The Blundstone company originated from companies set up by several free settlers who emigrated from England to Tasmania. John and Eliza Blundstone arrived in Hobart from Derbyshire, England on 14 October 1855. John Blundstone worked as a coachbuilder until 1870, when he began importing footwear from England later manufacturing boots in Hobart's Liverpool Street.

By 1892, Blundstone's eldest son, Sylvanus, had joined him in business, and the pair formed J. Blundstone & Son, manufacturing boots in two outlets on Collins Street, later buying a purpose-built two-storey factory on Campbell Street. The company's importation arm was run by John's other son, William, as W.H. Blundstone & Co.

Both companies initially prospered, but at the turn of the century, they found themselves in financial difficulty. J. Blundstone & Son was bought in 1901 by the Cane family of ironmongers, and W.H. Blundstone & Co. went bankrupt in 1909. The Canes ran the company until the Great Depression in Australia caused a downturn in profits, which once again saw the company sold. The buyers were two brothers: James T.J. and Thomas Cuthbertson, who purchased the business in 1932. They were grandsons of James Cuthbertson an English settler who set out for Melbourne in 1853, but were apparently blown off course by the Roaring Forties and landed in Hobart instead, where he had also set up a shoemaking and importing business.

The Cuthbertson brothers set about amalgamating their companies' manufacturing operations, retaining the Blundstone name for the company's tannery in South Hobart, and the factory and current headquarters in Moonah.

It was owned by Sir Harold Cuthbertson until his death, and was passed onto his heirs and daughters, Anne Routley and Helen Dickinson, who run it to this day.

Its company directors are Helen Dickinson, Anne Routley, Stephen Gunn and Damian Bugg.

The tannery closed in 2009.

== Models ==
Whilst the company is best known for its ankle-length boots, it also offers sandals and steel-toed boots.

In 2021, the company launched a vegan version of their boots, collaborating with the outdoor clothing brand, Finisterre.

== Factory closure ==
In January 2007, Blundstone Australia announced that, due to increased costs, it would shift production and manufacturing activities from Hobart and New Zealand to Thailand and India within the year, resulting in 360 job losses in Australia. However, Blundstone planned to continue to make 200,000 pairs of footwear at the Tasmanian factory each year, most likely gumboots.

Australian's construction union, the Construction, Forestry, Mining and Energy Union, announced that it would boycott the company if it moved its operations overseas.

The last two Australian-manufactured pairs of the Blundstone 803 are pictured here, unworn:

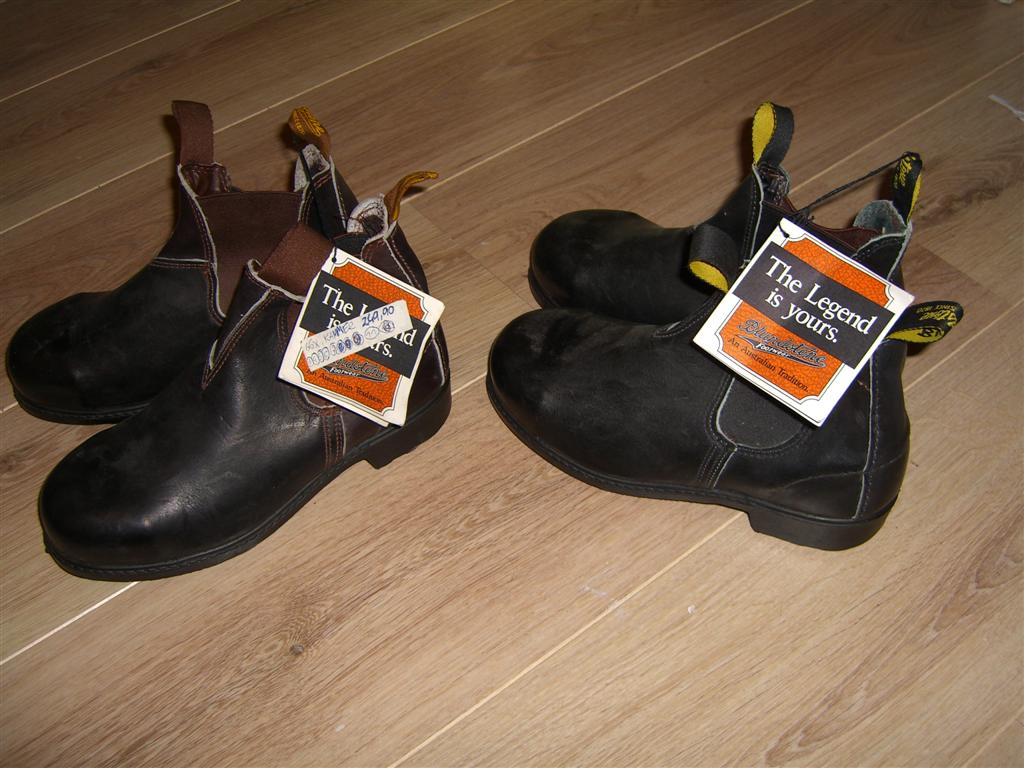

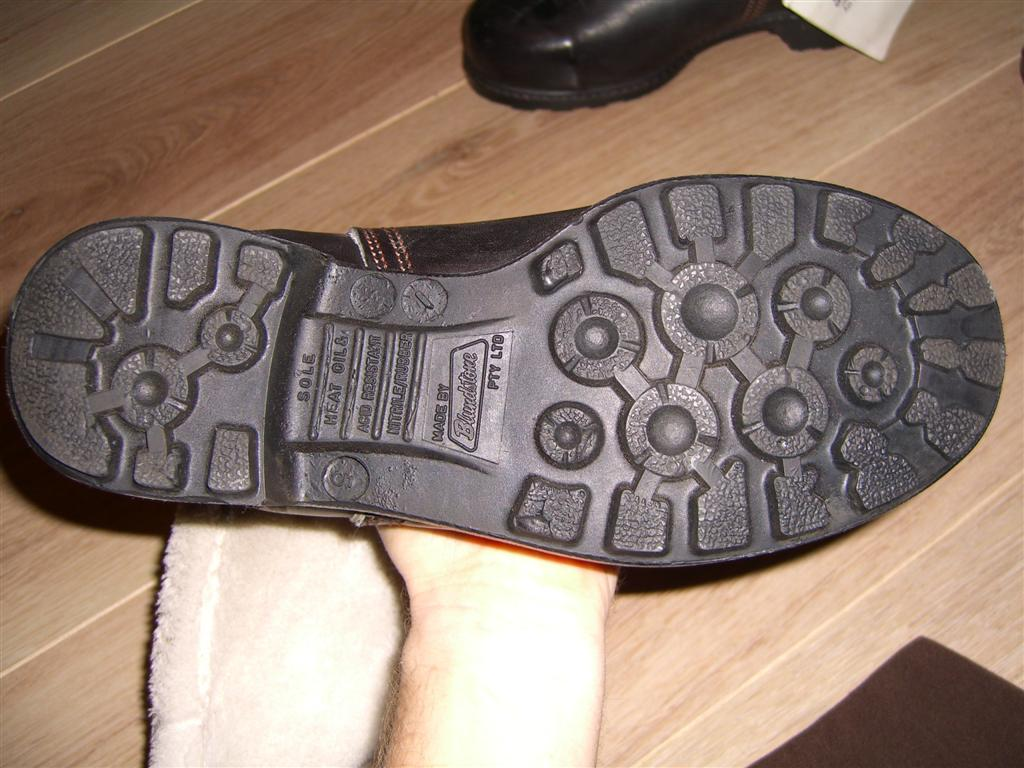

== See also ==
- List of oldest companies in Australia
