= Caroma =

Australian bathroom product designer and distributor

- Current owner: GWA Group
- Country: Australia
- Introduced: 1941
- Website: www.caroma.com.au

Caroma (Caroma Dorf) is an Australian designer and distributor of bathroom products. Caroma was established in 1941 by Hungarian-born Charles Rothauser. Since closing its last factory in 2017 now sources all products from third-party overseas manufacturers.

Caroma is a subsidiary of GWA Group, and introduced the world's first two-button dual flush toilet system. The company self-distributes within Australia and, in other countries, sells through distributors such as Sustainable Solutions International in North America and Sanlamere in the United Kingdom.

== History ==
The company was established in 1941 with a factory at Norwood, an inner eastern suburb of Adelaide. The company announced its intention to close down manufacturing in Australia on 8 October 2014. The factory at Wetherill Park in Sydney closed in 2014. It finally closed the Norwood factory on 24 February 2017. Manufacture now occurs in Malaysia, China and Europe.

== Caroma Dorf companies ==
The Caroma Dorf group of companies offers a range of bathroom, kitchen and laundry products from a number of brands.

- Fowler – toilets and basins
- Dorf – bathroom, kitchen and laundry products
- Clark – kitchen sinks
- Epure – a premium range of kitchen sinks by Clark
- Radiant – kitchen and laundry products
- Irwell – tapware products
- Stylus – baths, spas and other bathroom fixtures
- Dux Hot Water

== Innovations ==
- The first in the world to introduce the two-button dual flush system in 1982
- The first in the world to introduce the 6/3L dual flush cistern
- The first to introduce the 4.5/3L dual flush cistern through Smartflush technology
- The first company to gain a WELS 5 Star rating for toilet suites
- The first company to achieve an Australian WELS 6 Star rating for urinals

== Awards ==
- Australian Design Award for Excellence in Australian Design in the Housing & Building category (2009) – Caroma Invisi Series II Toilet Suite
- Australian Design Awards for Excellence in Sustainable Design (2007) – Caroma H2Zero Cube Urinal
- Australian Design Award for Excellence in Australian Design in the Housing and Building category (2005) – Smartflush Toilet Suite Range
