= Rossi Boots =

Australian owned boot manufacturer

- Industry: Footwear Manufacturing
- Founded: 1910
- Founder: Arthur Rossiter
- Headquarters: Kilburn, South Australia
- Products: Combat boots, Safety boots and Workwear
- Parent: S Kidman & Company
- Website: rossiboots.com.au

Rossi Boots is a South Australian boot manufacturer founded in 1910. The business headquarters is in Kilburn, South Australia.

Rossi Boots has made boots in offshore factories for a wide range of people, industries and uses. It has a vast network of international and local distributors. No Rossi boots are manufactured in Australia.

== History ==
Rossi Boots started in 1910 when Arthur Rossiter resigned from his position as a supervisor at the Adelaide Boot Company and started Rossiters Ltd in a small tin shed in his own backyard. Sales were initially slow, but increased due to World War I.

A bigger and larger factory was needed so the first of three stages of factory was built. The depression years were hard years and getting orders proved difficult. During World War II, Rossi Boots was a major supplier to the Australian Army making hundreds of thousands of boots which saw service in various theatres including New Guinea. The war years saw the number of employees peak at around 500.

In the years after the war, materials were scarce and it was then when the company introduced the concept of using old car tyres as a soling for boots.

Gradually since then the methods of manufacturing footwear have changed as petroleum based products such as glues, rubbers and plastics have replaced the traditional ones of leather, nails and threads. More modern machinery has been introduced than can directly mould soles to the bottom of boots and can easily pull leather over a last.

At the end of 1987 the company moved from Unley to Hilton. The move allowed production to be carried out in a more modern, fit-for-purpose factory. Since then the company has continued to change; introducing computer controlled machines for cutting, sewing and attaching soles. These changes occurred whilst many of Rossi's competitors moved offshore. Whilst the introduction of these machines reduced the number of local staff, it has enabled Rossi Boots to continue to manufacture in Australia. However, none of the current Rossi Range is manufactured in Australia.

In March 2019 Rossi Boots relocated the factory, warehouse and headquarters from Hilton to Kilburn. This move to a new, expansive location allows Rossi Boots to continue repairing operations In south Australia and continue to house all operations under one roof. However, no products are currently made in Australia. In December 2023, Rossi Boots was purchased by S Kidman & Company.

== See also ==
- Australian work boot
- Steel Blue (Footwear)
