= Filmer Sceats =

Australian optometrist (1901–1972)

- Born: Clarence John Filmer Sceats; 27 May 1901; Sydney, Australia
- Died: 13 November 1972 (aged 71); Kirribilli, New South Wales, Australia
- Education: Newington College
- Spouse: Joanne Mayhew Ross (Jean)
- Children: 2

Filmer Sceats F.I.O. was an Australian optometrist. The University of New South Wales Department of Optometry awards The Filmer Sceats Memorial Prize in recognition of his pioneering work in the field of optometry in Australia. His early optometry practice was based in Canberra and Queanbeyan and he made numerous connections within the Parliament of Australia including the Prime Minister Ben Chifley. His parliamentary connections led to optometry becoming a university degree having previously only been a college course. From the late 1920s Sceats was becoming known nationally as an expert in the area of optometry.

== Biography ==
Clarence John Filmer Sceats was the son of Ellen Sarah (née Hewson) and Francis Thomas Sceats of Sydney. He was born on 27 May 1901. His father was the well known New Zealand-born operatic baritone who regularly performed with J. C. Williamson's. Growing up in the inner city suburbs of Sydney he attended Newington College from 1915 until 1917. Although Sceats was generally a day boy at Newington in the second term of 1915 he was a boarding student. At that time his postal address was c/o 333 George Street, Sydney. That was the street address of Elvy & Co the long established pianoforte gallery & music warehouse. The musically talented Sceats family were associated with that firm for many years. Sceats studied in the Modern Form in the Intermediate Certificate preparing him for business rather than further studies at university. In 1917 the subjects he studied were French, English, History, Geography, Business Principles, Arithmetic, Algebra, Chemistry and Shorthand. He was a noted athlete known particularly as a hurdler. Sceats was in the Newington College Cadet Corps competition team that won the 1917 Sunlight Shield. The Sunlight Shield was a cadet competition where points were awarded for section drill, rifle exercises and a march past. After leaving high school Sceats studied optometry part time at Sydney Technical College for five years. In 1925 he started his own optical business in Canberra and Queanbeyan. He was on the Register of Optometrists for the State of New South Wales from that time. Having served in the Army Cadets at Newington Sceats enrolled in the Australian Army during World War II and served as a Lieutenant. After the war he returned to practice as an optometrist in Martin Place in central Sydney visiting the national capital regularly. In 1962 Sceats was appointed as an observer representing Australia at the world congress of optometry in Berlin. After a short illness Sceats died in 1972 at the age of 71. He was survived by his wife and two children. In 1973 the newly established University of New South Wales Department of Optometry started awarding The Filmer Sceats Memorial Prize. In the 1980s his son, Jonathan Hennessy Sceats, became interested in the design of eyewear. He was appointed inaugural Chairman of the Design Council at the Museum of Contemporary Art Australia in Sydney. He represented Australia in the design section of the World Fair in Barcelona and until the 2000s the Powerhouse Museum in Sydney held a permanent exhibition of his early work.
