= Motoi Oyama =

Japanese businessman and athlete

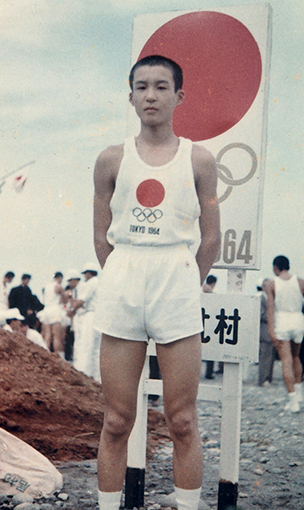
- Motoi Oyama at the 1964 Olympics
- Born: 2 February 1951 (age 75); Ishikawa Prefecture, Japan
- Education: Osaka City University

Motoi Oyama (尾山 基, born 2 February 1951) is a Japanese businessman specializing in footwear. After graduating from Department of Commerce of Osaka City University, in January 1982 he joined ASICS where he worked ever since. In July 2001 he became President of ASICS Europe, and between June 2004 and February 2008 held senior manager positions at the central ASICS offices. On 8 February 2008, he was appointed as ASICS President, and in April 2011 also became its chief executive officer.
