= Bickford's Australia =

Australian beverage manufacturer

Bickford's Australia Pty Ltd
- Type: Proprietary Limited
- Industry: Beverage manufacturer
- Headquarters: Salisbury, South Australia
- Key people: Angelo Kotses
- Products: Drink mixers and Soft drink
- Owner: Kotses family
- Subsidiaries: Vok Beverages
- Website: www.bickfords.net

Bickford's Australia Pty. Ltd. is an Australian beverage manufacturer based in South Australia. The brand produces traditional cordials, soft drinks, and iced coffee mix originally manufactured by A. M. Bickford & Sons, a pharmaceutical chemist founded by Anne Margaret Bickford in 1864. In 1999, the brandname was acquired by the Kotses family and later renamed Bickford's Australia, after which the brand saw a revival in popularity with the introduction of new flavours and products. In 2006, Bickford's lime juice cordial was recognised by the National Trust of South Australia as a Heritage Icon.

Today, Bickford's cordials, soft drinks, iced coffee and milkshake mixes remain widely available in supermarkets across Australia and cordials are available in Countdown supermarkets in New Zealand.

== History ==
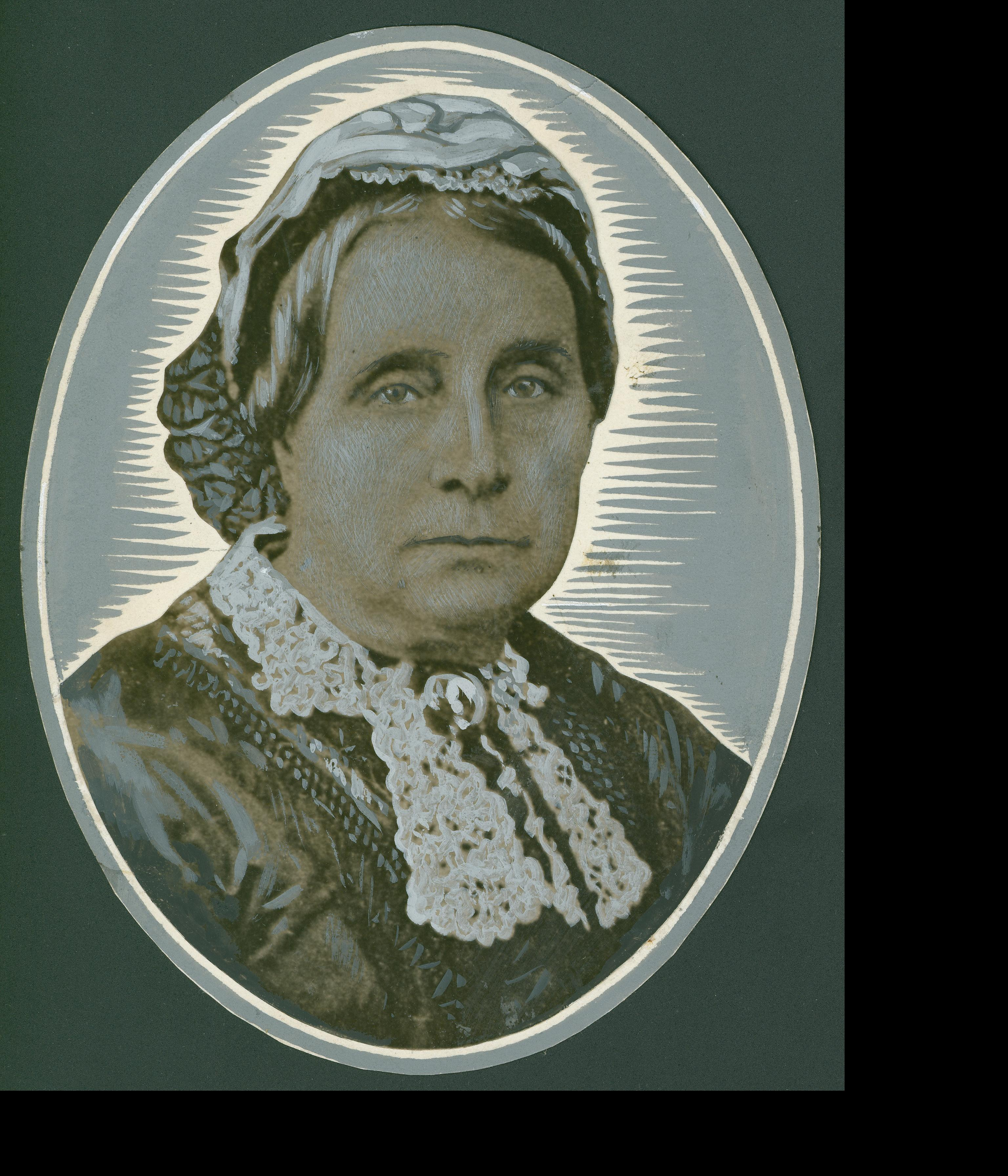
"Anne" Margaret Bickford (née Garrett 1810–1877)

After arriving in Adelaide, South Australia from England in 1839, chemist William Bickford operated a successful apothecary beginning the following year. After his death in 1850, his wife Anne Margret was determined to keep the business running, forming a partnership initially with son Harry Bickford in 1864, "Bickford and Son". In 1871, William Jr joined to form "A. M. Bickford & Sons".

Looking to branch out into other markets, in 1872 they built the South Australian Cordial Factory, a bottler and aerated water factory. Production of cordials and soft drinks commenced in 1874, among the first of which was their now iconic lime juice cordial. In 1903 the firm became a limited liability company, A. M. Bickford & Sons Ltd, and in 1920 commenced production of branded Coffee and Chicory Essence, (later renamed Bickford's Iced Coffee Mix), winning the gold medal at the 1930 All-Australian Exhibition.

In 1930, the company amalgamated with a number of Australian pharmaceutical companies to form the "Drug Houses of Australia" (DHA), which very successfully continued production of the "A. M. Bickford and Sons" products. Drugs and chemicals were produced under the DHA brand, whereas the cordials and soft drinks remained under the "A. M. Bickford and Sons".

In the late 1960s, DHA became the target of a corporate raider and asset stripper, and by the mid-1970s collapsed under massive debts. The remaining products were split up and sold. Reckitt & Colman acquired most major drug and chemical brands, and Melbourne businessman Peter Abbott purchased the pharmacy products and eucalyptus oil operations, which were incorporated into the "FGB" brand, as well as beverage products, which continued under the revived "A. M. Bickford and Sons" name. In 1987, FGB sold the soft drink business to the Lloyd family, and in 1999 it was purchased by the Kotses family, returning the Bickford's brand to South Australia, and expanding their line of products to include new cordials, soft drinks, and milkshake mixes.

In 2005, the company, now called "Bickford's Australia", moved operations into "a new state of the art manufacturing facility" in Salisbury, South Australia. Since then, the range of products, and the Bickford's Group has grown, forming partnerships with Vok Beverages, Wheel & Barrow, and Karma Living, as well announcing plans for a new distillery for the South Australian Riverland in February 2014.

== Products ==
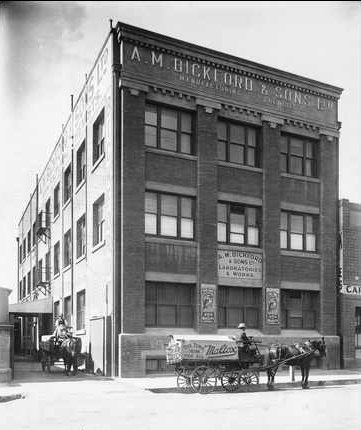
A.M. Bickford & Sons Ltd, Laboratories & Works, Waymouth Street, 1916

Bickford's Australia currently produces a variety of traditional cordials, juices and soft drinks.

Traditional Cordial: Lime Juice, Lemon Juice, Bitter Lemon, Lemon Barley, Lemon, Lime & Bitters, Bitter Lemon, Sarsaparilla, Blackcurrant, Peach Tea, Raspberry, Ginger Beer, Cloudy Apple

Premium Juice: Berries & Açaí, Cloudy Pear, Pomegranate, Super Berry Antioxidant, Cranberry, Prune, Coconut, Blueberry

Classic Juice: Tropical, Apple & Passionfruit, Apple & Blackcurrant, Apple & Peach

Old Style Soda: Lemon, Lime & Bitters, Ginger Beer, Creamy Soda, Original Kola, Sarsaparilla

Bickford and Sons Mixers: Ginger Ale, Bitter Lemon, Tonic Water, Soda Water

Milk Mix: Strawberry, Caramel, Vanilla Malt, Chocolate

Chiahh: Apple & Raspberry, Grape & Blackcurrant, Tropical

Esprit: Blueberry, Strawberry, Raspberry, Orange Tangerine, Passionfruit, Lemon Lime

Diet cordial varieties are also available. Other products produced by Bickford's include Iced Coffee Syrup (made since 1920), Fruities and Robinson's Fruit Shoot juice drinks for children, and Aqua Pura bottled water.

== See also ==
- List of South Australian manufacturing businesses
- South Australian food and drink
- List of oldest companies in Australia
