= Alcohol in New Zealand =

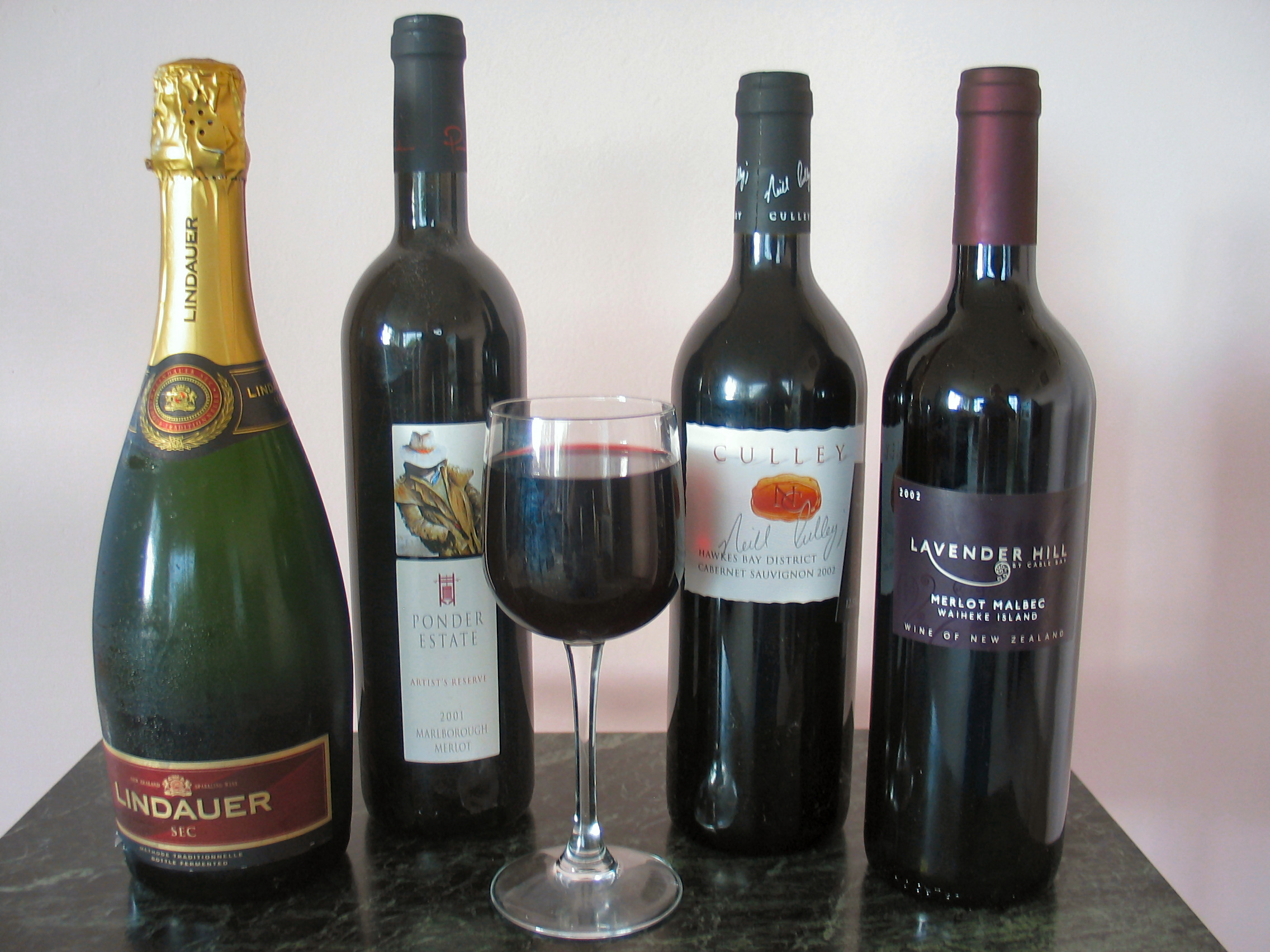
A selection of New Zealand wines

Alcohol has been consumed in New Zealand since the arrival of Europeans. The most popular alcoholic beverage is beer. The legal age to purchase alcohol is 18. New Zealand has an above average consumption rate of alcohol, in 2016 ranking 32nd globally in per-capita total alcohol consumption.

== History ==
=== Early history ===
There is no oral tradition or archaeological evidence of Māori using alcohol before the arrival of Europeans.

Captain James Cook brewed a beer while visiting New Zealand in order to combat scurvy aboard ship. It was brewed on Saturday 27 March 1773 on Resolution Island, in Dusky Sound, Fiordland from small branches of rimu and mānuka, wort and molasses. James Cook wrote:

"We also began to brew beer from the branches or leaves of a tree, which much resembles the American black-spruce. From the knowledge I had of this tree, and the similarity it bore to the spruce, I judged that, with the addition of inspissated juice of wort and molasses, it would make a very wholesome beer, and supply the want of vegetables, which this place did not afford; and the event proved that I was not mistaken."

Wine making and viticulture date to the pre-colonial era. British Resident and keen oenologist James Busby was, as early as 1836, attempting to produce wine at his land in Waitangi. In 1851 New Zealand's oldest existing vineyard was established by French Roman Catholic missionaries at Mission Estate Winery in Hawke's Bay. Due to economic (the importance of animal agriculture and the protein export industry), legislative (the strength of prohibition and temperance movements), and cultural factors (the overwhelming predominance of beer and spirit drinking amongst British settlers), wine was for many years a marginal activity in terms of economic importance. Dalmatian immigrants arriving in New Zealand at the end of the nineteenth and beginning of the twentieth century brought with them viticultural knowledge and planted vineyards in West and North Auckland. Typically, their vineyards produced sherry and port for the palates of New Zealanders of the time, and table wine for their own community.

The three factors that held back the development of the industry simultaneously underwent subtle but historic changes in the late 1960s and early 1970s. In 1973, Britain entered the European Economic Community, which required the ending of historic trade terms for New Zealand meat and dairy products. This led ultimately to a dramatic restructuring of the agricultural economy. Before this restructuring was fully implemented, diversification away from traditional protein products to products with potentially higher economic returns was explored. Vines, which produce best in low moisture and low soil fertility environments, were seen as suitable for areas that had previously been marginal pasture. The end of the 1960s saw the end of the New Zealand institution of the "six o'clock swill", where pubs were open for only an hour after the end of the working day and closed all Sunday. The same legislative reform saw the introduction of BYO (bring your own) licences for restaurants.

Finally, the late 1960s and early 1970s noted the rise of the "overseas experience", where young New Zealanders travelled and lived and worked overseas, predominantly in Europe. As a cultural phenomenon, the overseas experience predates the rise of New Zealand's premium wine industry, but by the 1960s a distinctly New Zealand identity had developed and the passenger jet made the overseas experience possible for large numbers of New Zealanders who experienced first-hand the premium wine cultures of Europe.

=== Temperance movement ===
Between 1836 and 1919, the New Zealand temperance movement became a powerful and popular lobby group, as similar movements did in the UK and the USA. In 1919 at a national referendum poll, prohibition gained 49% of the vote and was only defeated when the votes of returned servicemen were counted.

Well known temperance activists in New Zealand include William Fox, Frank Isitt, Leonard Isitt, Elizabeth McCombs, James McCombs, Kate Sheppard, Robert Stout and Tommy Taylor.

=== Alcohol law ===
==== First liquor laws ====
The liquor laws of New Zealand begin with the Colonisation of New Zealand and the implementation of English Common Law to New Zealand between 1840 and 1842, when New Zealand was jurisdictionally part of the Colony of New South Wales.

In 1842 the first licensing system was introduced to New Zealand. This licensing system was mainly based on the then-provincial councils, however this changed in 1873 when legislature was passed to establish a national licensing system.

===== Laws for Māori =====
The first laws prohibiting Māori people from consuming alcohol in New Zealand were established between 1847 and 1878. Laws were passed due to the common belief the Māori were susceptible to excessive alcohol use.

For over a century, from the 1847 laws to 1948, Māori were restricted to buying alcohol from off-licensed vendors. In 1948 Parliament repealed most discriminatory measures, in part due to pressure from Māori servicemen returning from war.

The King Country had an alcohol ban from when the predominantly Māori area was opened to Pākeha in 1883 to 1953.

==== Licensing Act, 1881 ====
The Licensing Act of 1881 was enacted due to the dissolution of the Provincial Councils of New Zealand to centralise the inconsistent statutes of the former Provinces. This created a minimum age of 16 to purchase alcohol in a bar, however did not impose a minimum age to purchase alcohol to be taken away.

It has never been illegal for a minor to drink alcohol in their own home on supervision of their parents or guardians, although parental consent is required to supply alcohol to a person under 18.

The Act banned alcohol sales on Sundays, Christmas Day, and Good Friday, and banned some entertainments, including dancing girls.

Off-licence alcohol sales were restricted to hotels, bottle shops, and private clubs.

==== 20th century ====
The legal drinking age was amended in 1910 when the legal age to drink in hotels was increased to 21. Minors could still buy alcohol to take home until 1914 when the age for both on- and off-licence purchase was set at 21. In 1969 the purchase age was lowered from 21 to 20.

===== Six o'clock swill =====
During a significant part of the 20th century, New Zealand hotels shut their public bars at 6 pm. A culture of heavy drinking, the "six o'clock swill", developed during the time between finishing work at 5 pm and the mandatory closing time only an hour later.

This six o'clock closing was introduced during the First World War, partly as an attempt to improve public morality and partly as a war austerity measure. It was made permanent in 1919 owing to pressure from the then powerful temperance movement.

While the new law was supposed to curb drunkenness and crime and to send men home early to encourage family life, it in fact had the opposite effect. It created a culture of binge drinking where men would finish work at 5 pm and had only one hour to drink as much alcohol as possible before closing.

In the 1949 New Zealand licensing hours referendum the vote was to retain six-o'clock closing, but in the 1967 New Zealand licensing hours referendum voters supported a move to 10 o'clock closing – and the "swill" ended on 9 October 1967.

===== Laws for women =====
In 1911, women could no longer be barmaids (with exemptions for existing barmaids and for relations of publicans).

Prior to 1961, women were generally restricted to private bars in hotels as legislation allowed licensees to refuse them service in the (cheaper) public bars.

===== 1990s =====
18-year-olds were allowed to drink in bars from 1990 on certain conditions, and in 1999 the legal purchasing age was lowered from 20 to 18

Until the 1990s off-licence alcohol sales were restricted to hotels and bottle shops. Private clubs were also allowed to sell alcohol for take home consumption. In 1990 supermarkets were granted permission to sell wine but not beer, but under amendments made in 1999, supermarkets and some smaller grocers now had permission to extend their liquor licences to sell beer as well as wine. The 1999 legislation also legalised the sale of alcohol on Sundays for the first time in nearly 120 years.

== Current status ==
The current law is the Sale and Supply of Alcohol Act 2012. An off-licence (that is, a licence to sell alcohol off the premises) is granted initially for one year and then subsequently renewed every three years. Supermarkets may sell beer, cider and wine with no more than 15% ABV only. Liquor (whisky, brandy, rum, gin, vodka, etc.), including ready to drink (RTD) mixed spirits, must be purchased at separate bottle shops (liquor stores). Dairies (small convenience stores) are not licensed to sell alcohol.

=== Special events ===
Under New Zealand law, pubs looking to operate after the 3-4am liquor sales ban will have to apply for special licensing from their local board.

=== Licensing trusts ===
Licensing trusts, under New Zealand law, are community-owned companies with a monopoly on the development of premises licensed for the sale of alcoholic beverages and associated accommodation in an area.

Thirty licensing trusts were established between 1944 and 1975. They were strongly supported by ministers Peter Fraser and Rex Mason.

=== Sale and supply to minors ===
The minimum purchase age for alcohol in New Zealand is 18 years. Legally, anyone purchasing alcohol must have valid photo identification on them, however in practice, identification is only requested from people who appear under 25. There are three approved forms of photo identification: a passport from any country, a New Zealand driver licence, or a 18+ card or Kiwi Access Card issued by Hospitality New Zealand.

Police, alcohol licensing and health authorities regularly check seller's compliance with the minimum purchase age by conducting random controlled purchase operations (CPOs). In a CPO, a volunteer aged between 15 and 17 attempts to purchase alcohol from a seller without identification. Sellers who fail a CPO (i.e. those who sell alcohol to the volunteer) are liable to prosecution. The person selling or serving the alcohol can be fined up to $2,000, while duty managers can be fined up to $10,000 and have their manager's certificate suspended for 28 days. The licensee can also be fined up to $10,000, and have their liquor licence suspended, prohibiting them from selling alcohol for up to seven days.

Alcohol may only be lawfully supplied to people under 18 by their parents or legal guardians, or by a third-party with the express consent of the minor's parents or legal guardians. People who unlawfully supply alcohol to minors, or do so in an irresponsible manner, may be fined up to $2,000.

== Harm ==
Alcohol causes significant harm in New Zealand, with Māori and Pacific peoples and young people being disproportionately impacted.

== Beer production ==
Beer is the most popular alcoholic drink in New Zealand, accounting for 63% of available alcohol for sale. New Zealand is ranked 21st in beer consumption per capita, at around 75.5 litres per person per annum. The vast majority of beer produced in New Zealand is a type of lager, either pale or amber in colour, and between 4%–5% alcohol by volume.

=== 19th and 20th centuries ===
The first commercial brewery in New Zealand was established in 1835 by Joel Samuel Polack in Kororareka (now Russell) in the Bay of Islands.

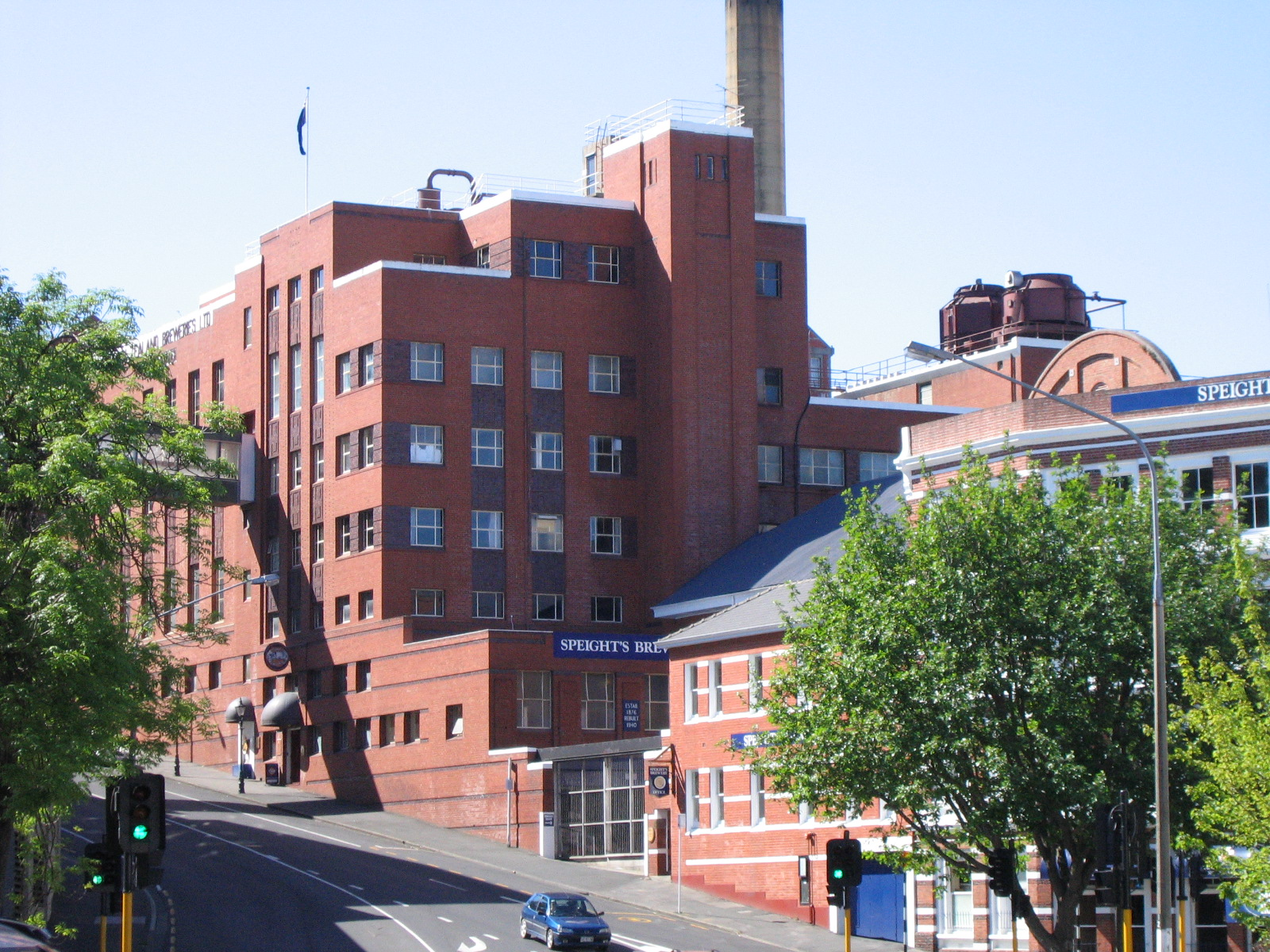
Speight's brewery in Dunedin

In the 1930s, the New Zealander Morton Coutts invented the continuous fermentation process. This, and the culture of the six o'clock swill, was to have an influence on the styles of beer brewed and drunk in New Zealand which shifted from ales to lagers, using continuous fermentation. The style of beer made by this method has become known as New Zealand Draught.

During the same period, there was a gradual consolidation of breweries, such that by the 1970s virtually all brewing concerns in New Zealand were owned by either Lion Breweries or Dominion Breweries.

From the 1980s small boutique or microbreweries started to emerge, and consequently the range of beer styles being brewed increased. The earliest was Mac's Brewery, started in 1981 in Nelson.

=== 21st century ===
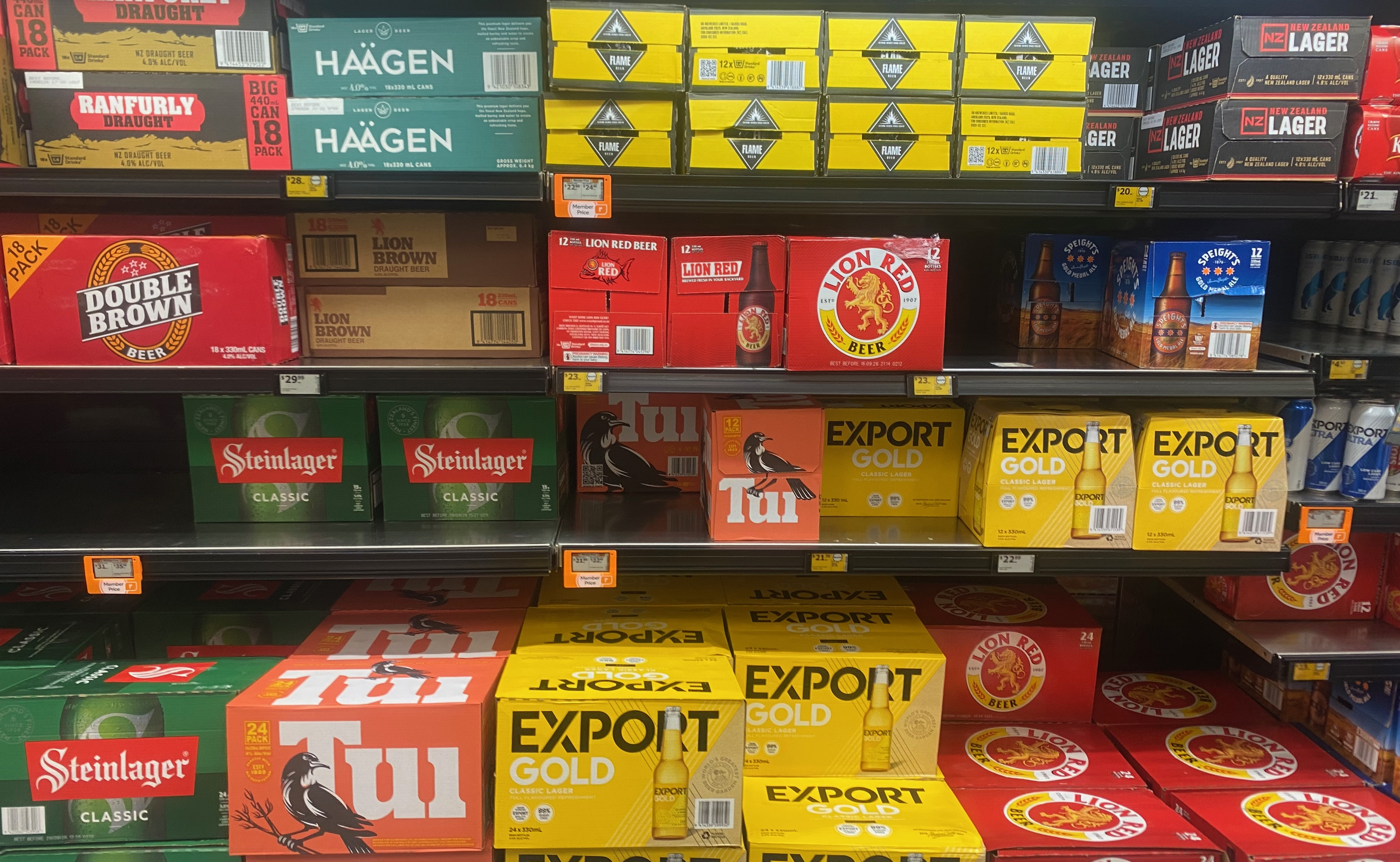
Domestic beer on display at a supermarket liquor section

In recent years, pale and amber lager, the largest alcoholic drinks sector in terms of volume sales, have been on a downward trend as a result of a declining demand for standard and economy products.

Conversely, ale production in New Zealand is primarily undertaken by small independent breweries & brewpubs, the Shakespeare Brewery in Auckland city being the first opened in 1986 for the 'craft' or 'premium' sector of the beer market. In 2010, this 'craft/premium' sector grew by 11%, to around 8% of the total beer market. This has been in a declining beer market, where availability of beer has dropped 7% by volume in the two previous years.

Craft beer and microbreweries were blamed for a 15 million litre drop in alcohol sales overall in 2012, with Kiwis opting for higher-priced premium beers over cheaper brands.

The craft beer market in New Zealand is varied and progressive, with a full range of ale & lager styles of beer being brewed. New Zealand lies in the ideal latitude for barley and hops cultivation. A breeding programme had developed new hop varieties unique to New Zealand, with many of these new hops have become mainstays in New Zealand craft beer.

Given the small market and relatively high number of breweries, many breweries have spare capacity. A recent trend has seen the rise of contract brewing, where a brewing company contracts to use space in existing breweries to bring the beer to the market. Examples of contract brewers include Funk Estate, Epic Brewing Company and Yeastie Boys.

Over 2011 and 2012, New Zealand faced a shortage of hops, which affected several brewers countrywide, and was mainly due to a hop shortage in North America and an increase in demand for New Zealand hops overseas.

== Wine production ==
=== First steps ===
In the 1970s, Montana in Marlborough started producing wines which were labelled by year of production (vintage) and grape variety (in the style of wine producers in Australia). The first production of a Sauvignon blanc of great note appears to have occurred in 1977. Also produced in that year were superior quality wines of Muller Thurgau, Riesling and Pinotage. The excitement created from these successes and from the early results of Cabernet Sauvignon from Auckland and Hawkes Bay launched the industry with ever-increasing investment.

=== Sauvignon blanc breakthrough ===
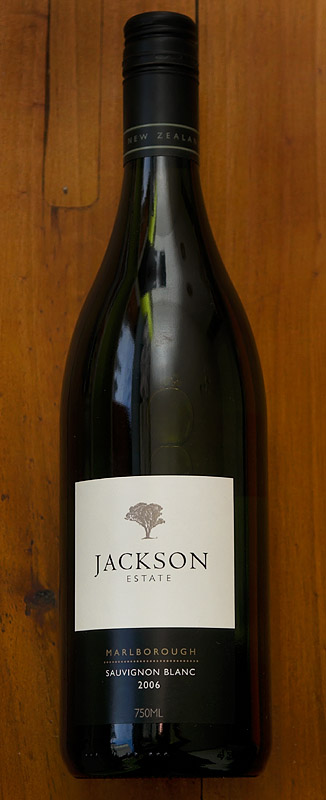
A bottle of Jackson Estate sauvignon blanc from New Zealand

In the 1980s, wineries in New Zealand, especially in the Marlborough region, began producing outstanding, some critics said unforgettable, Sauvignon blanc. "New Zealand Sauvignon blanc is like a child who inherits the best of both parents—exotic aromas found in certain Sauvignon blancs from the New World and the pungency and limy acidity of an Old World Sauvignon blanc like Sancerre from the Loire Valley" (Oldman, p. 152). One critic said that drinking one's first New Zealand Sauvignon blanc was like having sex for the first time (Taber, p. 244). "No other region in the world can match Marlborough, the northeastern corner of New Zealand's South Island, which seems to be the best place in the world to grow Sauvignon blanc grapes" (Taber, p. 244).

== Spirits production ==
New Zealand is unusual among Western nations in allowing the distillation of beverage alcohol as a hobby for personal use.

New Zealand has steadily grown in the number of distilleries, volumes produced and international recognition since the late 2000s. New Zealand distilleries have won International Spirits competitions across the world for their spirits. These distilleries include Reefton Distilling Co. (gin, vodka, whisky), Juno Spirits (Gin, Coffee Vodka) and 42 Below (vodka).

New Zealand grown botanicals provide a unique flavour profile to locally produced spirits. The Branching Out project undertaken by Venture Taranaki, in collaboration with Massey University, analyses specific terroir effects of key gin botanicals.

== See also ==
- New Zealand cuisine
- Hokonui Hills, an area renowned for illicit alcohol production during the nineteenth century
- List of countries by alcohol consumption
- New Zealand alcohol licensing referendums 1894–1987
