= Beer in New Zealand =

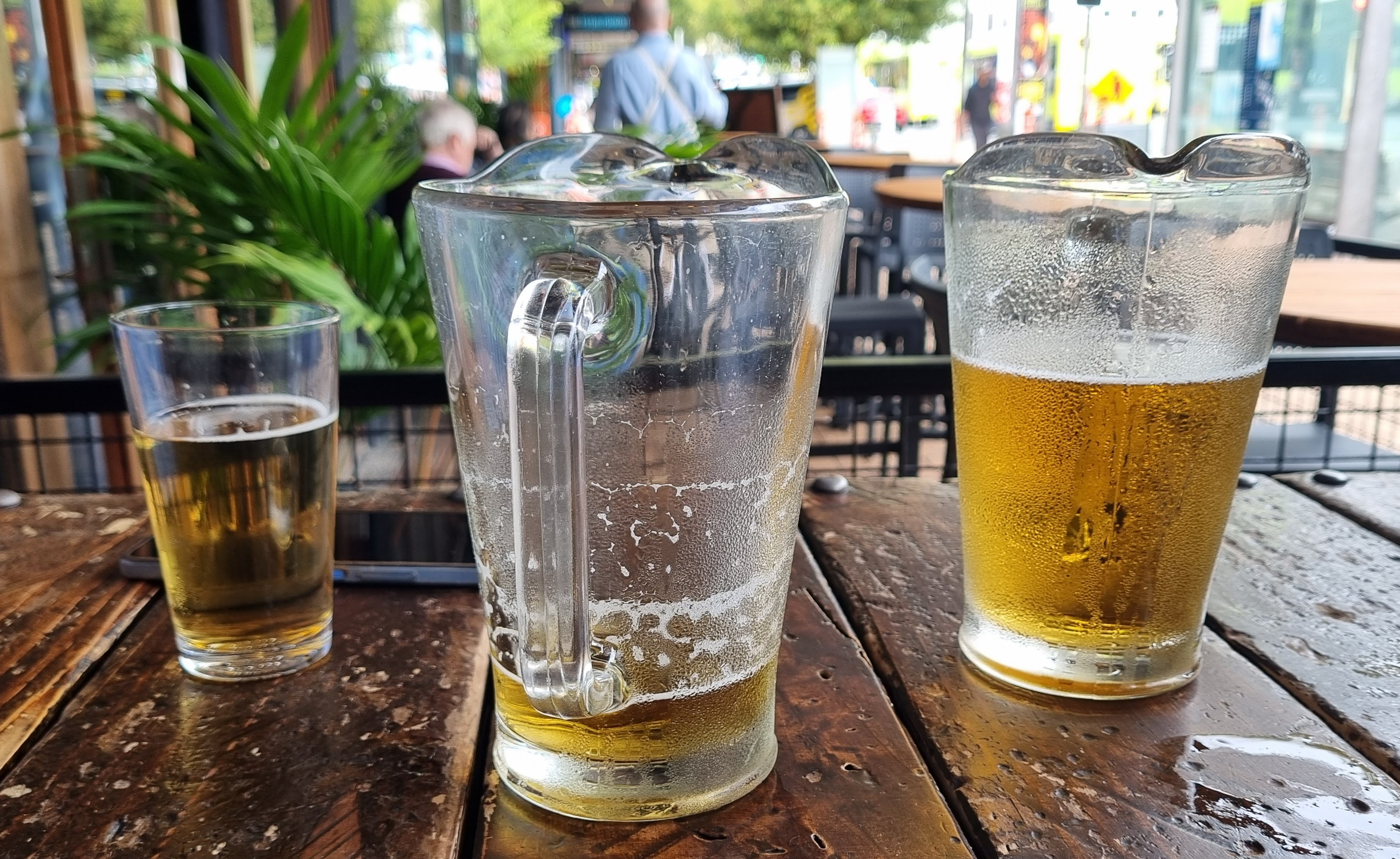
Jugs of tap beer

Beer is the most popular alcoholic drink in New Zealand, accounting for 59% of available alcohol for sale in 2023, down from 65% in 2009. At around 61 litres per person per annum, New Zealand was ranked 27th in global beer consumption per capita in 2019. About 85% of beer available in New Zealand in 2023 was produced locally, and 15% was imported. The vast majority of beer produced in New Zealand is a type of lager, either pale or amber in colour, and typically 4–5% alcohol by volume.

Although the two largest breweries in New Zealand, Lion New Zealand and DB Breweries, control almost 90% of sales by volume between them, there are over 200 smaller craft breweries and brewpubs producing a vast range of beer styles, including many ales.

== History ==
There is no oral tradition or archaeological evidence of the indigenous people of New Zealand (Māori) brewing beer before the arrival of Europeans and major ingredients of beer were not introduced to New Zealand until Europeans arrived in the late 18th century.

Captain Cook was the first to brew beer in New Zealand, on Resolution Island while anchored in Dusky Sound, Fiordland. He experimented with the use of young rimu branches and leaves as a treatment against scurvy, plus wort, molasses and leaves of the mānuka (tea tree). It was brewed on Saturday 27 March 1773.

We also began to brew beer from the branches or leaves of a tree, which much resembles the American black-spruce. From the knowledge I had of this tree, and the similarity it bore to the spruce, I judged that, with the addition of inspissated juice of wort and molasses, it would make a very wholesome beer, and supply the want of vegetables, which this place did not afford; and the event proved that I was not mistaken.

— Captain James Cook, A Voyage Towards the South Pole and Round the World, Volume 1

The first commercial brewery in New Zealand was established in 1835 by Joel Samuel Polack in Kororareka (now Russell) in the Bay of Islands. During the 19th century, the brewing methods of Great Britain and Ireland were introduced to New Zealand, being the countries from which the vast majority of immigrants originated during that time – thus the dominant beer styles would have been ales, porters and stouts.

=== 20th century ===
During the late 19th and early 20th century, the temperance movement in New Zealand had become a powerful and popular lobby group, as in the UK and the US. In 1919 at a national referendum poll, prohibition gained 49% of the vote and was only defeated when the votes of returned servicemen were counted. However, one aspect of wartime regulation was made permanent: a 6 pm closing time for licensed premises. This created the culture of the six o'clock swill, a law that was not repealed until 1967, and was to have an influence on the styles of beer brewed and drunk in New Zealand.

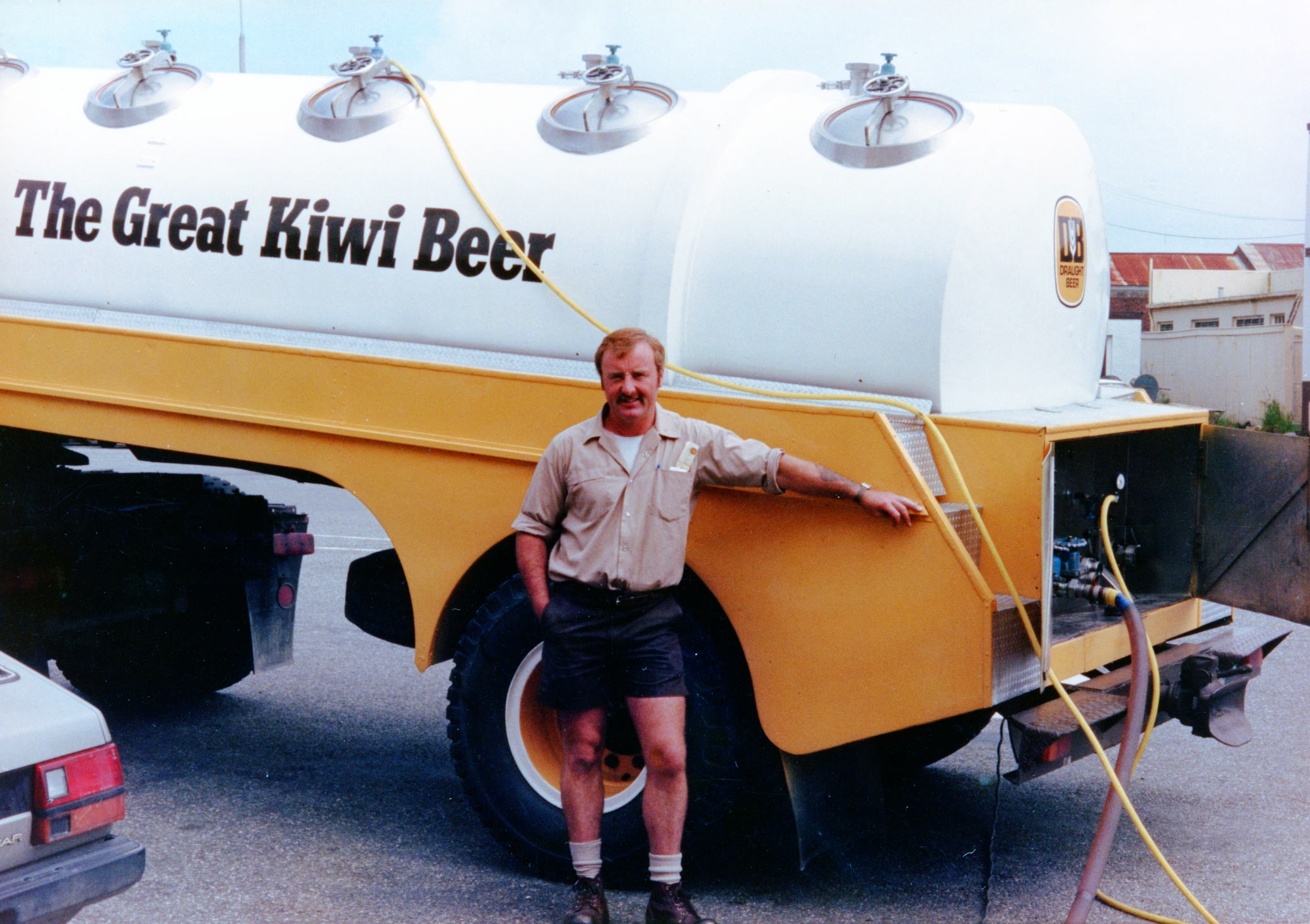
Beer tanker delivering beer to the Golden Eagle Hotel, Greymouth, in 1986

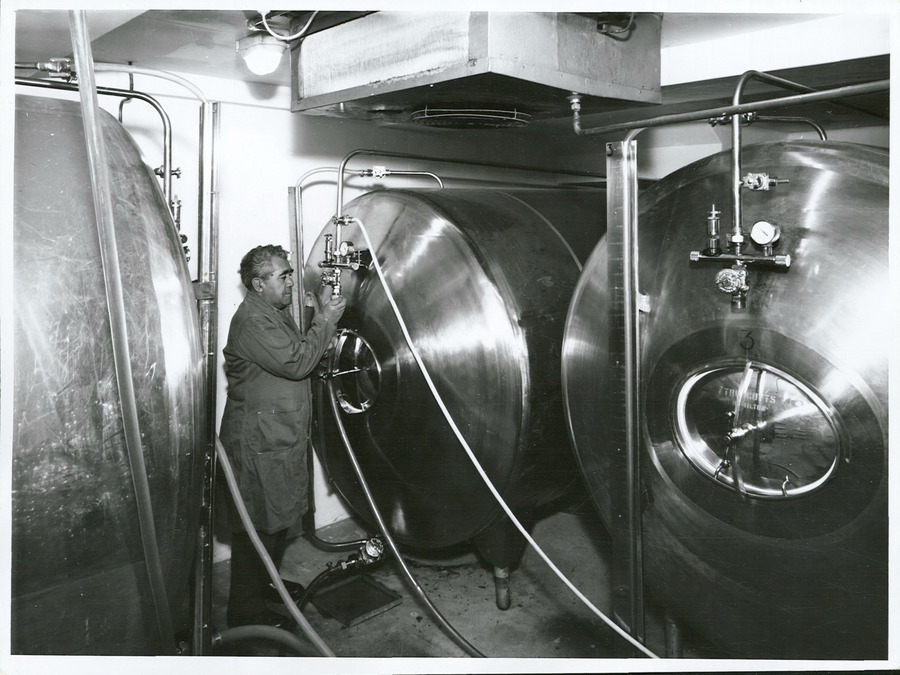
Beer tanks at De Brett's Hotel, Wellington, 1969

Prior to World War 2, beer was usually unfiltered, uncarbonated and bitter-tasting. Drinkers would often add a dash of lemonade to sweeten the beer. By 1946, tastes were changing, with consumers preferring a lighter, sweeter, chilled and carbonated beer. Hotels had begun to install equipment to provide chilled, pressurised beer in their taps, and sales of bottled beer for consumption at home increased since pubs closed at 6 pm.

In 1953, Morton Coutts at Dominion Breweries developed the continuous fermentation system, considered a revolution in brewing methods. The process was patented by Dominion Breweries in 1956. Gradually, beer production in New Zealand shifted from ales to lagers, using continuous fermentation. The style of beer made by this method has become known as New Zealand draught, and became the most popular beer during the period of 6pm closing. During the same period, there was a gradual consolidation of breweries, so that by the 1970s virtually all brewing concerns in New Zealand were owned by either Lion Breweries (now Lion New Zealand Ltd) or Dominion Breweries.

Beer was delivered to hotels and pubs in beer tankers. In 1963, "the world's biggest beer tanker" came into service in Dunedin. The stainless steel tanker had seven compartments which could each hold 300 gallons of beer, calibrated to official standards, and it could supply seven hotels in one trip from the brewery. The beer was kept chilled and under pressure until it reached its destination. On arrival at the hotel, the beer was pumped from the tanker to large holding tanks. A hotel would typically have three tanks: one in use, one full of beer being brought to the correct temperature, and the third one being cleaned ready for the next delivery. The beer was not exposed to air until it was pumped from the hotel's holding tank and poured into a glass.

In the 1980s, small boutique or microbreweries started to emerge, and consequently the range of beer styles being brewed increased. The earliest was Mac's Brewery, started in 1981 in Nelson. It was thought that the licence issued to the company was the first new licence issued to a brewery independent of Lion or Dominion since 1931. Some pubs operated their own small breweries, often housed within the pub itself.

=== 21st century ===
In recent years, pale and amber lager, the largest alcoholic drinks sector in terms of volume sales, have been on a downward trend as a result of a declining demand for standard and economy products. Conversely, ale production in New Zealand is primarily undertaken by small independent breweries and brewpubs, the Shakespeare Brewery in Auckland city being the first opened in 1986 for the 'craft' or 'premium' sector of the beer market.

The craft beer market in New Zealand is varied and progressive, with a full range of ale and lager styles of beer being brewed. In 2010, this 'craft/premium' sector grew by 11%. This was in a declining beer market, where availability of beer had dropped 7% by volume in the two previous years. With a growth rate of 25% per year, craft beer and microbreweries were blamed for a 15 million litre drop in alcohol sales overall in 2012, with Kiwis opting for higher-priced premium beers over cheaper brands.

Given the small market and relatively high number of breweries, many breweries had spare capacity. One trend was the rise of contract brewing, where a brewing company contracts to use space in existing breweries to bring the beer to the market. Examples of contract brewers include Epic Brewing Company, Funk Estate and Yeastie Boys.

The craft beer market reached a high in 2018, but since the COVID pandemic, sales of craft beers have declined. During 2024 several craft breweries went into liquidation as consumers' tastes changed and those struggling with the cost of living switched to cheaper beers. As of January 2025, there were around 200 craft breweries in New Zealand, with two-thirds being in the North Island. In 2025, the brewing industry was worth $3.3 billion annually to New Zealand's economy, with craft beer accounting for almost 20% of the value of the total beer market, or 13.5% by volume.

New Zealanders are drinking less overall than previously. Beer consumption fell by 4.4% in the year ending December 2023, the largest decrease since 2012, but the amount of zero- and low-alcohol beer consumed increased by 750% between 2019 and 2023.

== Styles ==
The most widely recognised style of beer to have originated in the country is New Zealand draught. This is generally a malty, lightly hopped amber, reddish-brown or copper-coloured ale-like lager with 4–5% alcohol by volume. Martyn Cornell, the British beer writer, has suggested that New Zealand draught is partly an evolution of the late 19th century mild ale, which was popular with the British working classes, many of whom emigrated to New Zealand. However, the beer is usually brewed using the continuous fermentation process and a lager yeast. Although New Zealand draught has a reputation as a cheap mass-market beer, craft beer versions are also available. Much of the original ale lineage lingers on in the branding of nearly all New Zealand draught beer, e.g. Speight's Gold Medal Ale and Waikato Draught. Other widely recognised New Zealand beer brands include Steinlager, first brewed in 1958, and internationally marketed as a premium New Zealand lager, Lion Red, a widely consumed amber-style lager, and Mac's, originally established as a craft brewery in Nelson in 1981, while breweries such as Emerson's and Panhead represent the later rise of New Zealand craft brewing and hop-forward beer styles. In addition to this, the New Zealand Consumers' Institute criticised Tui for claiming to be an "East India pale ale" when it is in fact an amber lager that bears no resemblance to the traditionally hoppy, bitter India pale ale style.

New Zealand's first dry beer was DB Export Dry, introduced by DB Breweries in August 1989. In 1998, DB Breweries introduced New Zealand's first 'super dry' beer, Export Super Dry.

New Zealand is fortunate in that it lies in the ideal latitude for barley and hops cultivation. A breeding programme had developed new hop varieties unique to New Zealand, and many of these new hops have become mainstays in New Zealand craft beer. During 2011 and 2012, New Zealand faced a shortage of hops, which affected several brewers countrywide. The shortage was primarily caused by a hop shortage in North America. Brewers Guild president Ralph Bungard noted that Americans were scrambling to get their hands on Kiwi hops as they were becoming more trendy in the American micro-brew market. One specialty brewery, Tuatara Brewery, had just commenced production of an American Pale Ale — when the American hop shortage arose, they then created an Aotearoa Pale Ale, with New Zealand hops.

== Breweries ==
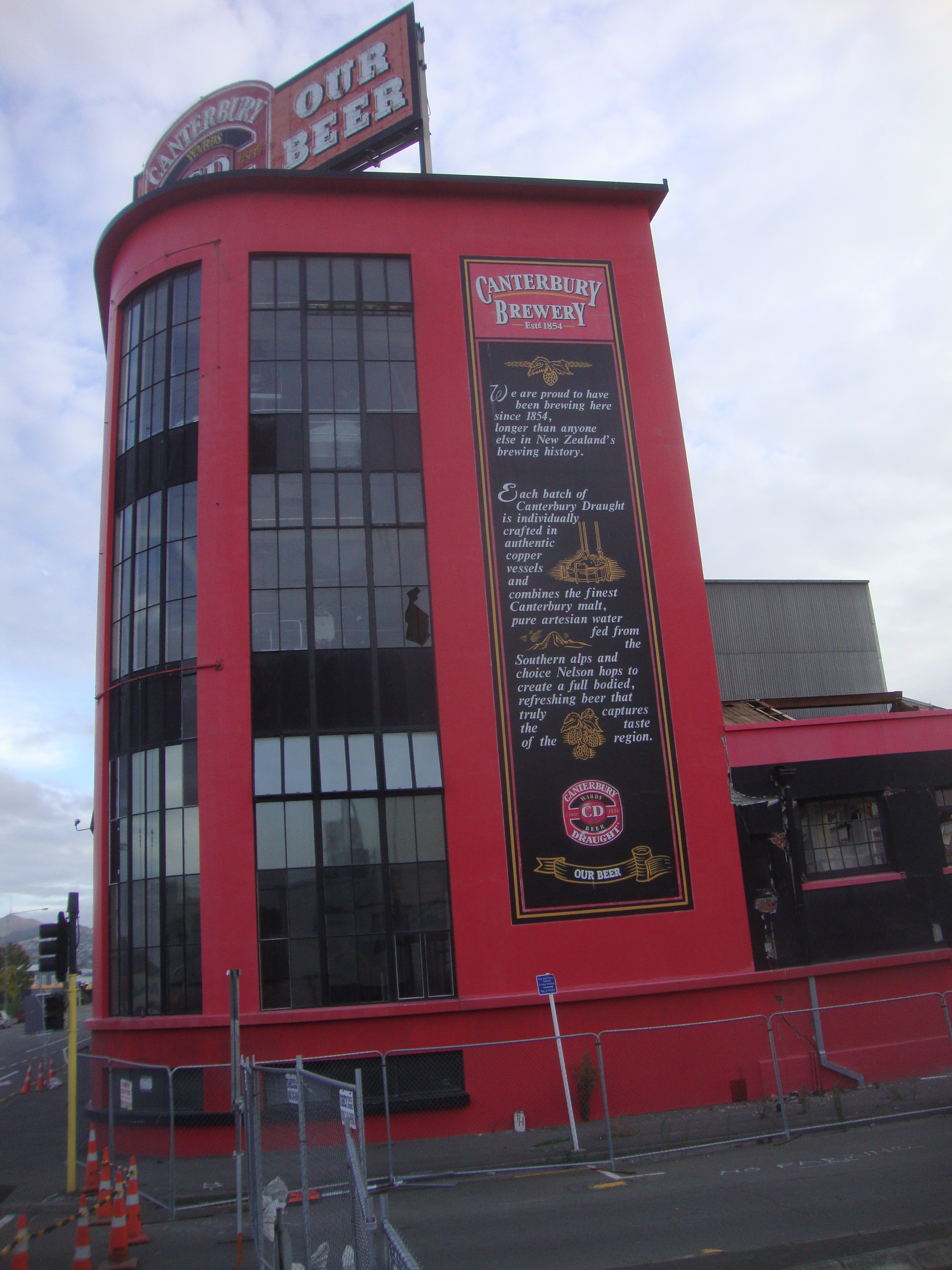
The tower of the Canterbury Brewery before demolition

=== Large breweries ===
- Lion Breweries (owned by the Japanese company Kirin) which beer brews include brands like Steinlager, Mac's, Waikato Draught and Lion Red.
  - Speight's Brewery
  - Emerson Brewing Company
  - Panhead Custom Ales
- DB Breweries (owned by Heineken, based in The Netherlands)
  - Monteith's Brewing Company
  - Tuatara Brewing
- Independent Breweries Ltd (owned by the Japanese company Asahi)

In addition, some international brands are brewed under licence in New Zealand. Some examples are Heineken, Amstel, and Tiger (DB Breweries); Kingfisher, Carlsberg, Holsten, and Tuborg (Boundary Road); and Kilkenny, Corona, Budweiser, Guinness, Stella Artois, and Beck's (Lion Nathan).

=== Microbreweries, nanobreweries and contract brewers ===
The following list contains some of the notable craft breweries of New Zealand. There are numerous other small breweries and brands.

| Brewery Name | Location | Founded | Notes |
|---|---|---|---|
| Bays Brewery | Nelson | 1993 | |
| Emerson's Brewery | Dunedin | 1993 | In November 2012 the brewery was purchased by Australasian company Lion. |
| Epic Brewing Company | Auckland | 2006 | |
| Garage Project | Wellington | 2011 | 2017 Champion Brewery. |
| Harrington's Breweries | Christchurch | 1991 | Sold to Lion in 2018. |
| Invercargill Brewery | Invercargill | 1999 | Went into receivership in March 2018 and liquidation in 2019. |
| McCashins Brewery | Nelson | 1981 | Sold to Lion in 2000. |
| Moa Brewing Company | Marlborough Region | 2003 | |
| Steam Brewing Company | Auckland | 1995 | Contract brewer for independent brands. |
| Yeastie Boys | Wellington | 2008 | Brewed by Urbanaut Brewing in Auckland. |

=== Brewpubs ===
- Dux de Lux, Christchurch
- Fork & Brewer, Wellington – Champion Small Brewery of NZ 2018; winner of the Crustacean Beer Competition 2023

== Retail sale of beer ==
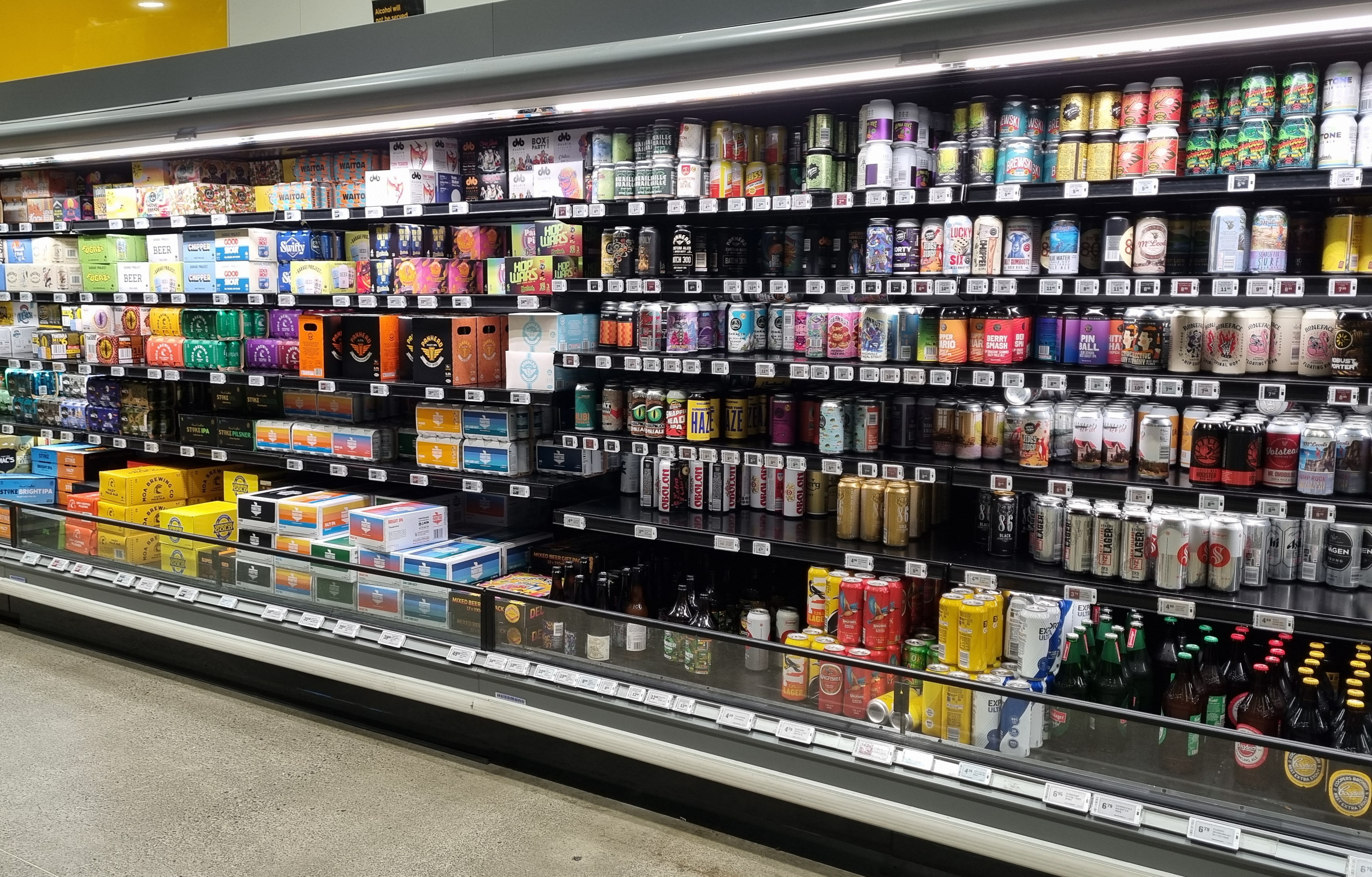
Supermarkets sell many kinds of beer in cans and bottles.

Beer for home consumption can be bought at some breweries, specialist liquor stores (often known as 'bottle shops') and in supermarkets. Beer is packaged in kegs, glass or plastic bottles in various sizes or in individual-serve aluminium cans. It was formerly possible to buy beer in a refillable half-gallon (later 2 litre) flagon (also known as a 'half-g' or 'goon') at a pub or bottle store but this became much less popular in the 2000s as consumer tastes changed and suppliers were reluctant to fit out new premises with the equipment needed. Breweries may offer their own refillable flagons.

Beer to be consumed in bars and restaurants is sold in cans or individual-serve bottles or, in the case of tap beer, by the glass or jug. It is common to order a 'pint' of beer in a bar, but although a pint was a standard unit of measurement in the former imperial system, there has never been a standard measurement for a pint of beer in New Zealand. A 'pint' or large glass of beer may contain anywhere from about 400 ml to 560 ml of beer. A 'jug' of beer (typically 1 litre but occasionally 1.5 litres) is sold in many pubs and taverns.

Individual-serve bottles and cans of beer may contain more than one standard drink, which is defined as a drink containing 10 grams of pure alcohol. A 330 ml can or bottle of 4% ABV beer is one standard drink.

== See also ==
- Beer and breweries by region
- Crate Day
