= Temperance movement in New Zealand =

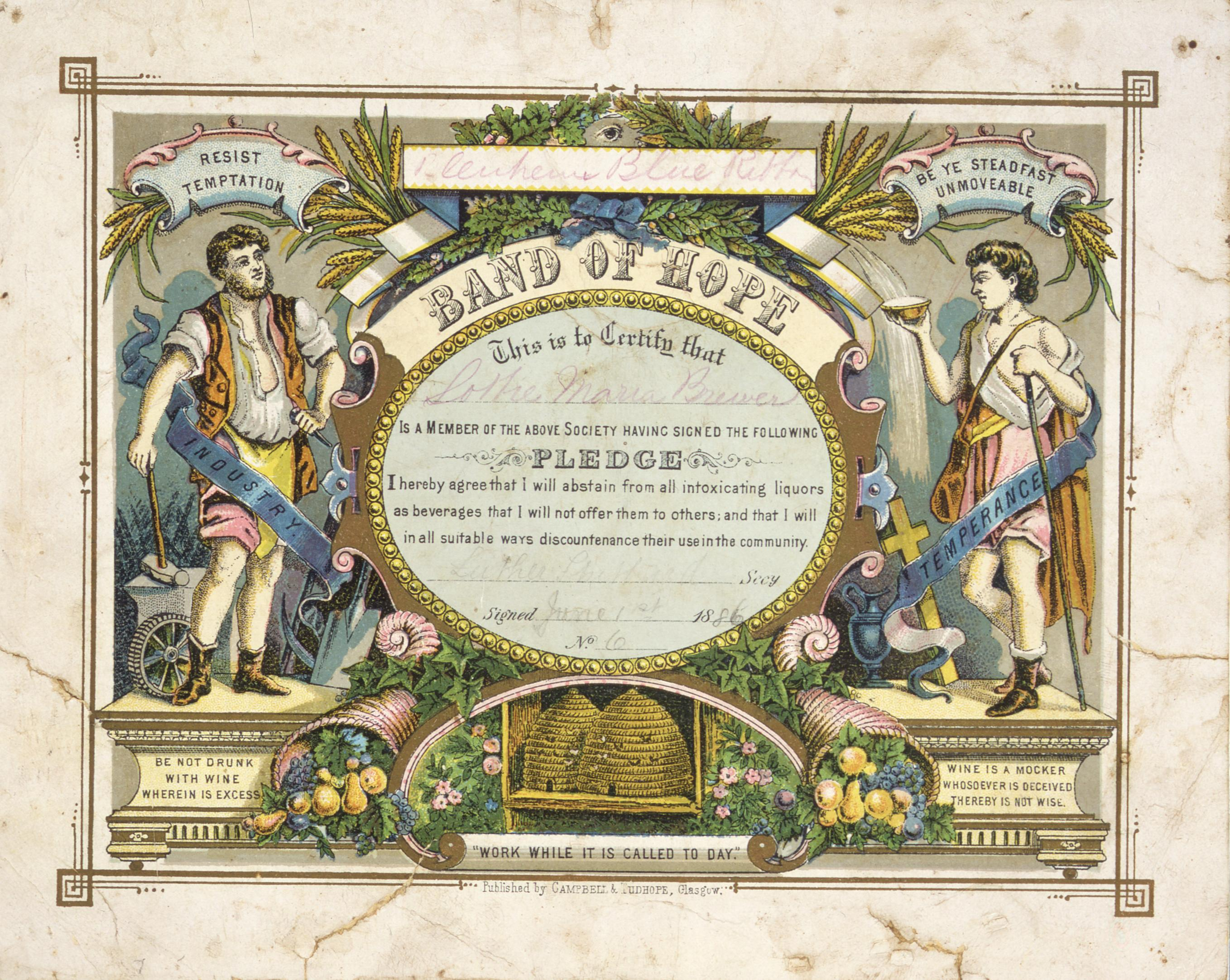
Membership certificate (dated June 1886) of the Blenheim Blue Ribbon Branch of the Band of Hope. The text reads "This is to certify that [Lottie Maria Brewer] is a member of the above society having signed the following pledge."

The temperance movement in New Zealand originated as a social movement in the late-19th century. In general, the temperance movement aims at curbing the consumption of alcohol. Although it met with local success, it narrowly failed to impose national prohibition on a number of occasions in the early-20th century. Temperance organisations remain active in New Zealand today.

== Early movement ==
In 1834, the first recorded temperance meeting was held in the Bay of Islands (Northland). The public meeting was led by the Methodist Mission staff in Mangungu on the Hokianga River.

Beginning in the 1860s, many Non-conformist churches encouraged abstinence among their congregations, and numerous temperance societies were established throughout the country. Many provinces passed licensing ordinances giving residents the right to secure, by petition, the cancellation or granting of liquor licences in their district. The Licensing Act of 1873 allowed the prohibition of liquor sales in districts if petitioned by two-thirds of residents. Despite the efforts of the temperance movement, the rate of convictions for drunkenness remained constant in New Zealand.

New Zealand temperance organisations as of 1885 – separate from clubs centred in a church or mission station - included:

- Independent Order of Rechabites (also known as the Sons and Daughters of Rechab), primarily located in Auckland (established 1863)
- Band of Hope Union (established 1863), first a City Band of Hope in 1859 in Auckland held in the home of E. Tremain then moved to a schoolroom on Hobson Street under the sponsorship of Richard Archur and F. Battley; after two other Bands formed in the area, the Auckland Union was established in 1865.
- Independent (later International) Order of Good Templars (estab. 1872), with the Temperance Herald published out of Dunedin.
- Sons and Daughters of Temperance (established 1871) first in Dunedin; by 1887 a National New Zealand Division was established, granting charters to new lodges.

In 1885 an American temperance evangelist, Mary Greenleaf Clement Leavitt of Boston, arrived in New Zealand as the first World Woman's Christian Temperance Union (WCTU) missionary. She started in Auckland where her message for women's leadership in protection of the home was widely appreciated, and the first chapter of what became the New Zealand Women's Christian Temperance Union. She traveled throughout New Zealand, including to Invercargill where a local WCTU chapter had already begun under the leadership of Eliza Ann Palmer (Mrs. Charles W.) Brown. Leavitt formed eight more unions in the five months she was in New Zealand, and she left the rest of the organizing of local chapters—a total of 15 by the time of the first national convention in 1886—to Anne Ward of Wellington. Leavitt carried with her the World WCTU's Polyglot Petition and gathered 4004 signatures to add to what ultimately became nearly eight million signatures calling for world prohibition, freedom from drugs and the end to human trafficking. The NZ WCTU became a beacon for women's rights and protection of children throughout the world, and in New Zealand became an important organising arm for political reform at the municipal level as well as women's right to vote at the national level.

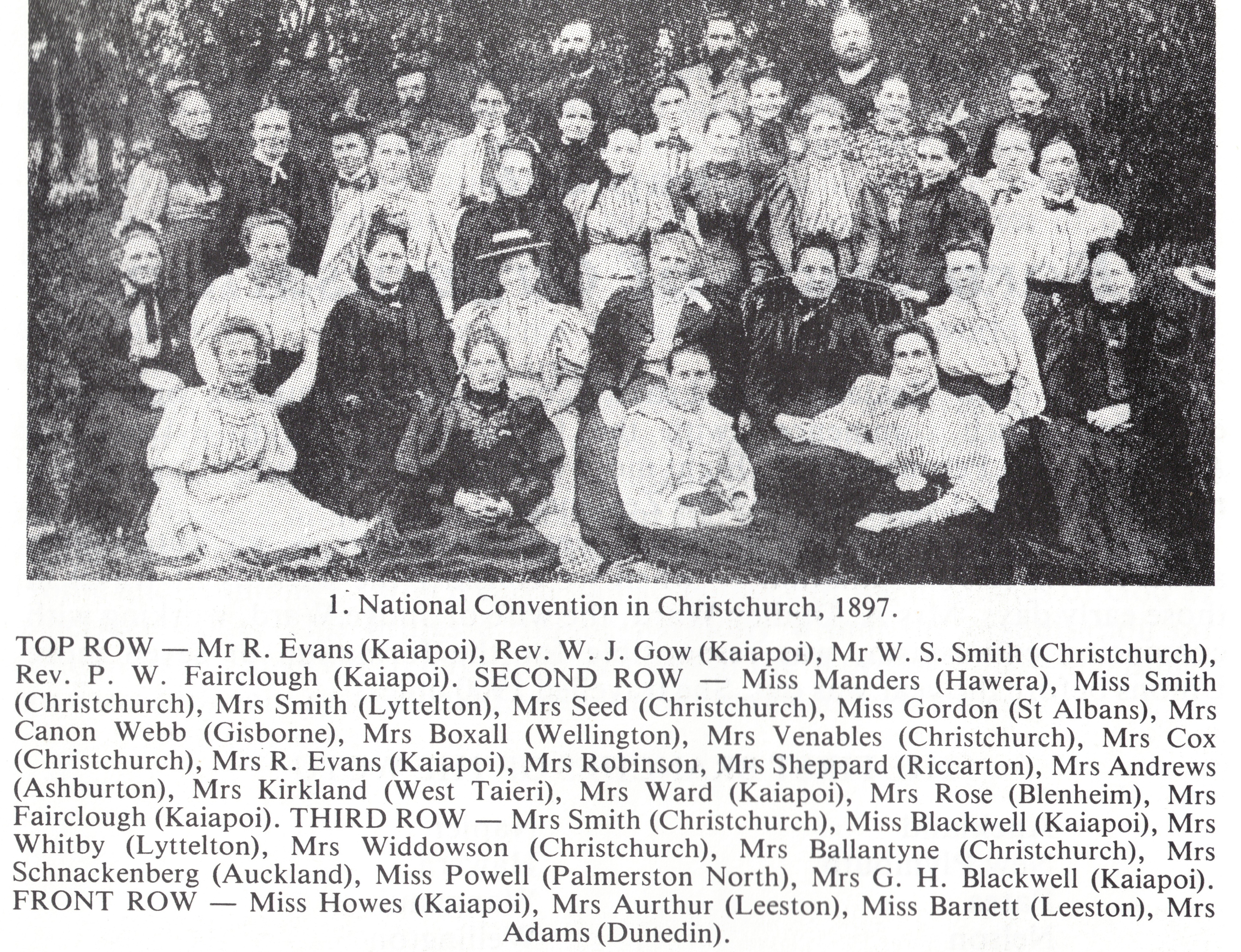
The New Zealand Women's Christian Temperance Union

In 1886, a national body called the New Zealand Alliance for Suppression and Abolition of the Liquor Traffic was formed, with Sir William Fox as the founding president, pushing for control of the liquor trade as a democratic right. Early in 1886, arrangements were made for T. W. Glover, a lecturer from the United Kingdom Alliance, to conduct prohibition missions in various New Zealand centres. On 1 March 1886, at the Rechabite Hall, Wellington, 30 delegates – representing Auckland, Nelson, Hawke's Bay, Woodville, Canterbury, New Plymouth, Dunedin, Wellington, Alexandra (Otago), Invercargill, Greymouth, Masterton, the Blue Ribbon Union, the Good Templars Lodge, the Rechabite Lodge, and the Wellington Alliance met, to establish a union of the temperance alliances in New Zealand. This conference formed and drafted a constitution for the New Zealand Alliance for the Suppression of the Liquor Traffic and the following officers were elected: president, Sir William Fox; sixteen vice-presidents, including David Goldie, Hori Ropiha, Sir Harry Atkinson, Leonard Isitt, and Sir Robert Stout; executive committee, F. G. Ewington, Edward Withy, George Winstone, H. J. Le Bailey, J. Elkin, Dr C. Knight, John Waymouth, and R. Neal. Henry Field (Nelson) became the first general secretary and T. W. Glover the first paid organiser. The conference adopted the United Kingdom Alliance's (1853) declaration of principles.

Towards the end of the 19th century, it became apparent that problems associated with settlement, such as larrikinism and drunkenness, were growing in society. Increasing urbanisation heightened public awareness of the gap between social aspirations and reality of the young colony. Generalisations from newspapers, visiting speakers & politicians in the 1890s allowed development of large public overreaction and fervour to the magnitude of the problem of alcohol.

== Political action ==
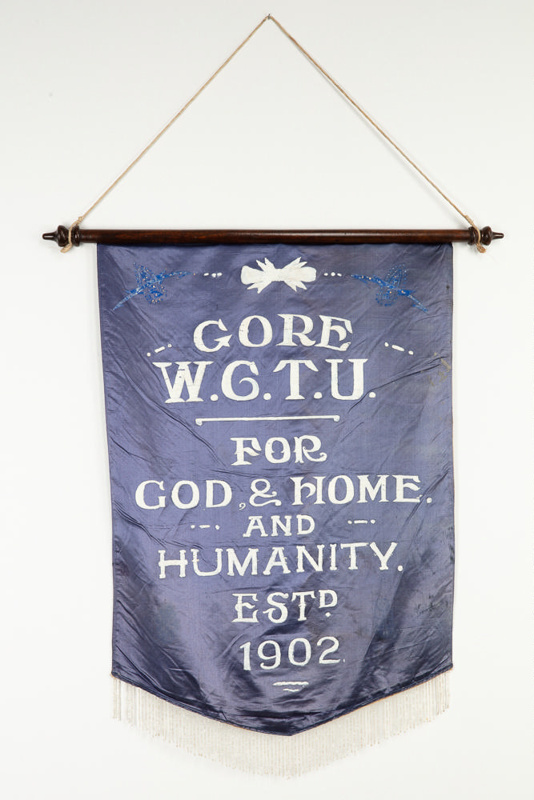
19th-century banner of the Women's Christian Temperance Union in Gore

In 1893, the Alcoholic Liquors Sale Control Act aligned licensing districts with parliamentary electorates. Licensing polls were to be held with each general election. There were now three options to choose from. These were "continuance of the "status quo", reduction of the number of liquor licences by 25 percent, and "local no-licence" which would prevent public sale of alcohol within that electorate. Continuance and reduction only needed a majority, but local no licence needed three-fifths majority. From 1908, national prohibition became the third choice instead of reduction of licences – needing a three-fifths majority. In 1894, Clutha electorate voted ‘no-licence’ and in 1902 Mataura and Ashburton followed suit. In 1905 Invercargill, Oamaru and Grey Lynn voted ‘no-licence’. In 1908 Bruce, Wellington Suburbs, Wellington South, Masterton, Ohinemuri and Eden voted ‘no-licence' and many wine makers were denied the right to sell their wines locally and were forced out of business.

In 1911, the Liquor Amendment Act provided for a national poll on prohibition and the New Zealand Viticultural Association was formed to “save this fast decaying industry by initiation of such legislation as will restore confidence among those who after long years of waiting have almost lost confidence in the justice of the Government. Through harsh laws and withdrawal of government support and encouragement that had been promised, a great industry had been practically ruined.” Also in 1911, a national referendum on prohibition was held, with 55.8 percent in favour of prohibition, but not enough for the sixty percent majority required.

In 1914, sensing a growing feeling of wowserism, Prime Minister Massey lambasted Dalmatian wine as "a degrading, demoralizing and sometimes maddening drink." Another referendum was held this year with 49 percent voting in favour of prohibition. The three-fifths majority was replaced with a fifty percent majority. The 1917 election was delayed until 1919 because of the First World War.

In 1917, New Zealand introduced mandatory early closing of bars and pubs. This created a phenomenon known as the "six o'clock swill"—a culture of heavy drinking developed during the time between finishing work at 5 pm and the mandatory closing time only an hour later.

On 10 April 1919, a national poll for continuance was carried with 51%, due only to votes of the Expeditionary Force soldiers returning from Europe. On 7 December 1919, prohibition gained 49.7 percent of the vote; of the 543,762 votes originally cast, the prohibition lobby only lost out by 1632 votes and of the 1744 special votes, 278 were for prohibition. Restrictive legislation was introduced on sale of liquor, however by 1928 the percentage of prohibition votes had started to decline.

Early-closing laws were eventually repealed in 1967 after a referendum was held on the subject of closing times for New Zealand pubs (though an earlier referendum in 1949 had retained it).

== Present movement ==
Temperance organisations, such as the Women's Christian Temperance Union New Zealand and New Zealand Alliance for Total Suppression of the Liquor Trade, continue to remain active in New Zealand today. Newer groups, such as Alcohol Advisory Council of New Zealand, focus their efforts on "the connections between health and alcohol; road accidents and alcohol; and patterns of youth drinking with associated sexual health issues."

== See also ==
- Alcohol in New Zealand
- Blue Ribbon Army (also known as Gospel Temperance Mission)
- International Organisation of Good Templars
- New Zealand alcohol licensing referendums 1894–1987
