= Green Man Brewery =

New Zealand brewery

- Location: Dunedin, New Zealand
- Opened: 2006

Active beers
Name	Type
Best Bitter	Bitter
Celt	Doppelbock/Dark Mild
Dark Mild	Dark Ale
Enrico's Cure	Barley Wine
Keller	Lager
Premium Pils	Pilsner
Stout	Stout
Strong	Doppelbock
Wheat Beer	Bavarian Wheat Beer
Whisky Bock	Doppelbock

Green Man Brewery is a microbrewery located in Dunedin, New Zealand established in 2006. Green Man produces a range of beers and prides itself on its strict use of organic ingredients and batch brewing. Green Man also considers itself as a sustainable brewery, relying on an on site bottle recycling plant.

In 2008, their beers won two gold medals, one silver and a best-in-class at the BrewNZ Beer Awards.

== Radler Controversy ==
Green Man brewery was threatened with legal action by Monteith's Brewery over the use of Monteith's trade marked name 'Radler'. An application by the Society of Beer Advocates to have the brewery's Radler trademark revoked has been issued on the basis that the term Radler is an historic style of beer and can therefore not be owned.

== See also ==
- Beer in New Zealand
