= Frederick Joseph Kühtze =

German-born New Zealand brewer (1833–1901)

Frederick Joseph Kühtze (8 April 1833–21 November 1901) was a New Zealand brewer. He was born in Cologne, Germany on 8 April 1833.

Kühtze's son William Joseph Kühtze went on to establish the Waitemata Brewery in 1929, which later became part of Dominion Breweries under the management of grandson Morton Coutts.

His name was later lent to the Joseph Kuhtze lager beer brand made by Dominion Breweries during the 1980s.
