= Henry Kelliher =

New Zealand businessman (1896–1991)

Sir Henry Kelliher
- Born: Henry Joseph Keliher; 2 March 1896; Waikerikeri, Central Otago, New Zealand
- Died: 29 September 1991 (aged 95); Auckland, New Zealand
- Occupation: Businessman
- Known for: Founder of Dominion Breweries; Director of the Bank of New Zealand; Philanthropist

Sir Henry Joseph Kelliher (2 March 1896 – 29 September 1991) was a New Zealand businessman, brewer, publisher, managing director, art patron and credit reformer.

== Early life ==
Henry Joseph Kelliher (né Keliher) was born in Waikerikeri, near Clyde in Central Otago, New Zealand on 2 March 1896; the son of an Irish immigrant Michael Keliher who came to New Zealand during the Goldrush in Central Otago. Information about his early years is not plentiful but moved to the Wairarapa at the age of 17 to work as a Drover in Carterton prior to the outbreak of World War I.

== World War I ==
When war broke out in Europe in 1914 Kelliher enlisted with the Otago Mounted Rifles as served as a Trooper until he was transferred during service at Gallipoli in 1915. Kelliher survived the Gallipoli campaign and served in France at the Somme in a specialised Trench Warfare mortar team until he was gassed and invalided to Britain in 1917.

== Business ==
By the time the war ended in 1918, Kelliher and his new wife had returned to New Zealand and began farming in the Wairarapa. He pulled out of farming to invest in the Marquis of Normanby Hotel in Carterton, one of the few licensed drinking venues in the Wairarapa area due to the dry-state that the town of Masterton had been placed in several years earlier. Through this investment Kelliher began to grow his fortunes and soon began investing in other local drinking establishments and hotels. From 1922 Kelliher chose to base himself in Auckland where he saw the potential for investment opportunities and soon began acquiring agent licences for key brands of spirit such as Dewar's White Label Whisky in 1926. He also invested in the New Zealand magazine Ladies Mirror in which he promoted the rights of progressive women and extolled the rights of women, particularly those widowed young after the war, to engage in education and trade. He also used this magazine to begin his campaign on monetary reform after he took editorial control of the magazine in 1930.

Unlike many businessmen during this era, it was by 1929–1930 that Kelliher had made an exceptionally comfortable living having not yet reaching 35. He chose however to continue his business ventures, choosing to invest with a South Auckland Brewing family run by Morton Coutts. Through this Brewery Henry Kelliher founded the company of Dominion Breweries which would eventually become a household name in New Zealand. Kelliher used his investment prowess to continue to purchase hotels and other drinking establishments across New Zealand to promote the brands he was creating as well as acquiring other leading international and local beer and spirit brands; these actions leading to the Australian Securities Exchange considering Dominion Breweries one of the leading enterprises of New Zealand.

Kelliher at this time was considered one of the 10 richest men in New Zealand and was appointed by the Michael Savage led Labour Government to act as the Government representative Director on the Bank of New Zealand, prior to its Nationalisation. He served in this capacity from 1936 to 1942, when despite the war, he felt his principles had to take precedence over what he felt was inappropriate financial action on behalf of the Government. During the war his businesses remained steady and ensured that Dominion Breweries kept paying those staffers who had signed up for active war service, something he could no longer undertake due to age and prior injury. He also oversaw the embarkment of several consignments of lager for the servicemen stationed in the Middle east. After the war, Kelliher's business skyrocketed with a market share of approximately 20% of all liquor and other alcohols in New Zealand being from one of his breweries or licensed hotels; it has been opined that Kelliher's actions effectively created the current situation in New Zealand where most drinking establishments are aligned to one major brewery or another despite Dominion Breweries no longer owning the vast majority of the former hotels. By the 1960s DB Breweries was a leading brand and Kelliher although still very active as Managing director of the Company had his eyes on new ventures.

== Philanthropy ==
Kelliher has begun his engagement in Philanthropy through the magazine, Ladies Mirror in the early 1930s but it was in 1956 when he created the Kelliher Art Prize, that this became a leading component of his investment. The prizes consisted of an award of 500 Pounds to those artists that produced what he felt was a great example of New Zealand landscape scenery, from the early 1960s he included a separate non-abstract watercolor painting component of the prize. In 1989 Kelliher stated:

I believe it was those early memories of the Central Otago landscape that made me decide, years later, to finance the Kelliher Art Awards, so that our artists here might be encouraged to record the beauty of the country for posterity

This prizes today is considered in mixed light due in part to the considerations by some art critics, such as Hamish Keith, as being detrimental to the growth of New Zealand art due to the strict parameters of the prizes. The Art collection is now administered by the Kelliher Art Trust. The Prize was discontinued as an annual award in 1977 due to the growth of New Zealand art but the Charitable Trust still engages in purchases and the promotion of Exhibitions through his descendants.

Henry Kelliher also established the Kelliher Economic Prize for schools which was initially established in 1963 and is still annually awarded.

In the 1963 New Year Honours, Kelliher was appointed a Knight Bachelor, for public and philanthropic services. In 1956, he was created a Commander of the Order of St John.

== Family ==
While in Britain recovering from injuries sustained during the War, Kelliher met his to-be wife Evelyn. They were married in Belfast, Northern Ireland on 17 July 1917 in the Roman Catholic faith. She had been previously married but widowed at an early age. The family would go on to have 4 daughters and a son, Henry Kelliher Jr, a Painter who pre-deceased his father.

== Later life ==
Kelliher stepped down from active involvement in Dominion Breweries in 1982, taking on the Honorary title of Founding President. From this time on he mostly remained at Puketutu Island which he had owned since the 1950s. Puketutu Island, in the Manukau Harbour, is a large island, now connected to the mainland off the coast of the Auckland airport. Here Kelliher had spent several decades raising champion Bulls, Stud Horses and Racing stock such as the former Champion Racehorses Cardigan Bay and Easton Light among others of which he used many for stud upon their retirement. He practised yoga well into old age.

== Death and legacy ==
Following his son's early death in 1984 and his wife Evelyn's death in 1986 he withdrew to Puketutu island. He stayed semi-active in the community until his death in September 1991 at the age of 95. He was survived by his daughters, grandchildren and numerous great-grandchildren. He was buried in Hillsborough Cemetery in Auckland overlooking Manukau Harbour and Puketutu Island.

In 1998, Kelliher was posthumously inducted into the New Zealand Business Hall of Fame.
