= Puketutu Island =

Island in Auckland, New Zealand

- Te Motu a Hiaroa
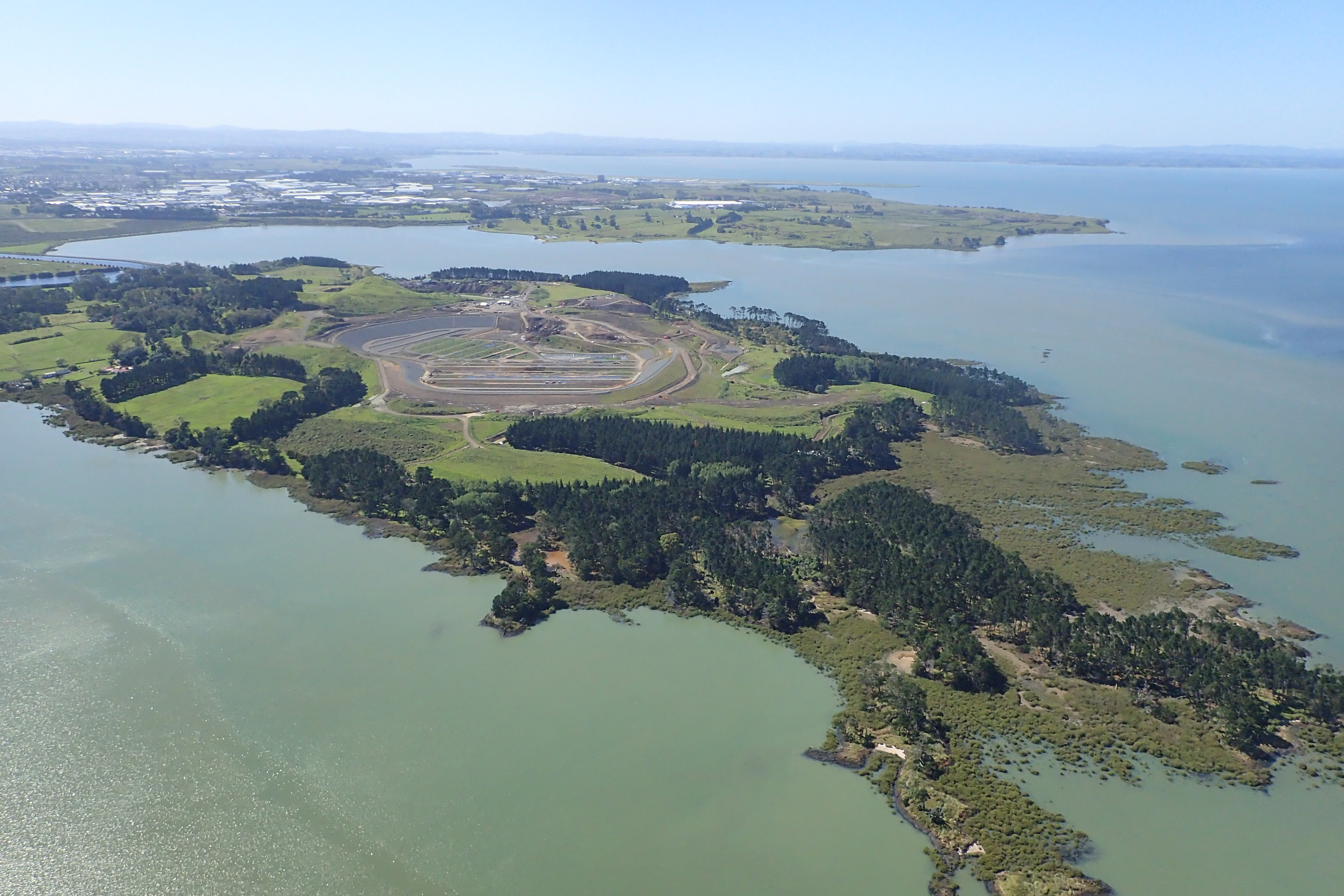
- Puketutu Island in 2018

Highest point
- Elevation: 65 m (213 ft)
- Coordinates: 36.965186°S 174.747248°E

Geography
- Location: North Island, New Zealand

Geology
- Volcanic field: Auckland volcanic field

Puketutu Island is located in Manukau Harbour.

Puketutu Island, also known as Te Motu a Hiaroa, is a volcanic island in the Manukau Harbour, New Zealand, and is part of the Auckland volcanic field. European settlers called it Weekes' Island, but this was eventually abandoned in favour of the historical Māori name. The island is joined to the mainland via a causeway known as Te Ara Tāhuna.

Te Motu a Hiaroa means "the island of Hiaroa" in reference to an ancestor who arrived on the island after journeying on the Tainui waka. Puketutu refers to one of the several maunga (mountains) and puke (hills) on the island. The New Zealand Ministry for Culture and Heritage gives a translation of "tutu shrub hill" for Puketutu.

== History ==
Approximately 18,000 years ago during the Last Glacial Maximum when sea levels were over 100 metres lower than present day levels, the Manukau Harbour was a river valley. Puketutu was a hilly feature which rose from the surrounding area. Sea levels began to rise 7,000 years ago, eventually separating Puketutu from the mainland.

Te Motu a Hiaroa is linked in Māori traditions to Mataaoho, the deity responsible for volcanic activity, who created the wider Auckland volcanic field. The creation of these volcanoes is the result of Te Riri o Mataaoho (‘the wrath of Mataaoho’). It once contained a number of volcanic cones and hills which were used for the construction of pā and the establishment of tuahu (altars). Its lava flows and rich friable soils were gardened for kumura and other cultivates, similar to the Otuataua Stonefields at Te Ihu a Maataoho (Ihumātao). The Island is said to be protected by several guardian taniwha, and is closely associated with the arrival of the Tainui waka around the 14th century. From its earliest settlement the island has been occupied by tohunga and rangatira, earning it a reputation as an island of tohunga and a whare wānanga or place of learning traditional Māori mātauranga and tikanga. The island is considered sacred to Tainui and Te Waiohua iwi and hapū. Alienation of the customary owners of the island occurred in the mid 19th century during colonisation.

Doctor Henry Weekes settled on Puketutu Island in 1846, inspired by the novel Robinson Crusoe to live on an island. Waiohua related Tāmaki Māori who lived on the mainland near Ihumātao helped Weekes to settle on the island; building him a whare and later a European-style house, fences, and teaching him how to fish for the flounder of the Manukau Harbour. Weekes farm suffered from a series of misfortunes, making farming the island difficult. The cows he brought to the island would habitually drown in the Manukau Harbour after becoming stuck in the low tide mud, and his horse once ate his entire vegetable crop after breaking a fence. Weekes decided to move back to the mainland after an incident where his boat capsized with his wife on-board. For a period, Weekes managed the farm from afar, however decided to sell the island after fire lit to control bracken fern spread to the farmhouse.

In the 1950s, several of its scoria cones were heavily quarried for fill to extend Auckland Airport nearby, along with the construction of the Mangere wastewater oxidation ponds which bordered the island. The island's highest point, 65m high Te Taumata a Rakataura (Pinnacle Hill), was retained. Sir Henry Kelliher had owned the island since the 1940s. The Kelliher charitable trust proposed a scheme whereby biosolids from the nearby Māngere wastewater treatment plant (covering 600ha on the landward sides, and served around 600,000 people in the 1990s) could be used to reshape the older form of the island. While the process could take up to 35 years, the final goal was envisaged as reestablishing the Māori customary owners and providing open space for Aucklanders. Watercare then bought a long-term lease of the island and transferred the island's title ownership to Te Motu a Hiaroa (Puketutu Island) Charitable Trust, with representatives from Waikato-Tainui, Te Kawerau a Maki, and Makaurau Marae/Te Ahiwaru Waiohua.

Te Motu a Hiaroa Charitable Trust plans to reestablish a whare wānanga and has a partnership with Auckland Council to rehabilitate the island and create a type of cultural park accessible to the people of Auckland.

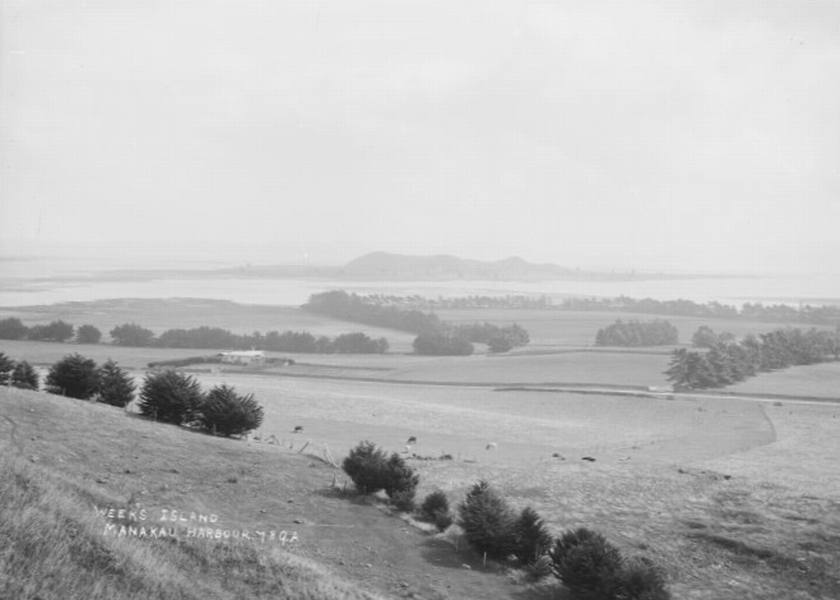
Puketutu Island (then called 'Weekes' Island') in the 1910s, before it lost most of its cones to quarrying.

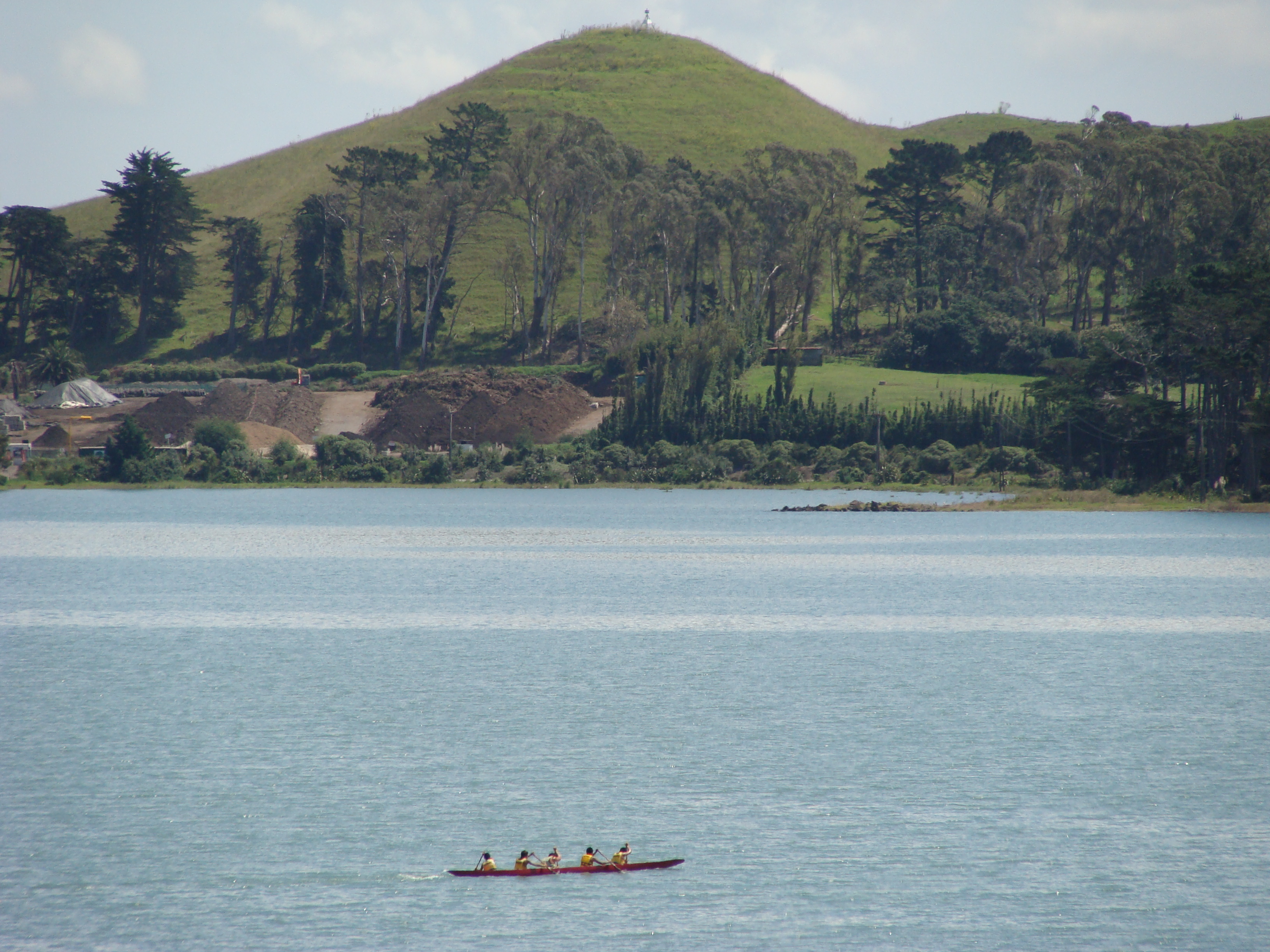
Puketutu Island's Pinnacle Hill, with a waka or canoe in the foreground.

== See also ==
- New Zealand outlying islands
- List of islands of New Zealand
- List of islands
- Desert island

== See also ==
- City of Volcanoes: A geology of Auckland – Searle, Ernest J.; revised by Mayhill, R.D.; Longman Paul, 1981. First published 1964. ISBN 0-582-71784-1.
- Volcanoes of Auckland: A Field Guide. Hayward, B.W.; Auckland University Press, 2019, 335 pp. ISBN 0-582-71784-1.
