= Monteith's =

New Zealand brewery

Monteith's Brewery Company
- Industry: Beverages
- Founded: 1868
- Headquarters: Greymouth, New Zealand
- Products: Beers and lagers
- Parent: DB Breweries (Heineken N.V.)
- Website: www.monteiths.co.nz

Monteith's Brewery Company
Active beers
Name	Type
Black Beer	Dark lager
Celtic Beer	Lager
Golden Lager	Lager
Original Ale	Lager
Pilsner Beer	Pilsner
Radler Bier	Lager
New Zealand Lager	Lager

Seasonal beers
Name	Type
Summer Ale	Ale
Winter Ale	Ale

Other beers
Name	Type
Past Seasonal beers
Bock Bier
Doppelbock Bier
Porter Dark Ale	Dark Ale
Saison Biere
Dortmunder Bier
Kristall Wiezen Bier
Oud Bruin Bier
West Coast 140 Pale Ale
Specialty beers
Tripel Beer
Baltic Porter	Dark Ale

Monteith's Brewery Company was originally a family-owned brewing company until it was bought by DB Breweries. It continued to brew its beers on the West Coast of New Zealand until DB decided that the cost of keeping production there was no longer viable. The Greymouth brewery was closed on 22 March 2001, but reopened four days later following a public outcry.

The beers are now produced in Auckland, and Timaru as well as Greymouth. On 25 July 2012, the newly transformed Greymouth brewery was officially reopened after 18 months of refurbishment.

The brand Monteith's has existed only since 1990 and the connection back to the original Stuart Monteith, who didn't even name his brewery after himself (it was called Phoenix), is tenuous at best.

In 1927, Monteith's Phoenix Brewery was one of five – in Reefton, Hokitika and Kumara – that amalgamated to become Westland Breweries, a company headed by Stuart's son, William Monteith. The new organisation was based at Turumaha Street, Greymouth, but there was no brewery on site, just a bottling plant until 1949 when a centralised brewery started to take over the operations of the other breweries in the group.

One by one, the breweries making up Westland Breweries were closed, with the original Monteith-owned Phoenix Brewery in Reefton pumping out its last beer in 1963, leaving the centralised Greymouth plant the only one servicing the area. In 1969, the expanding empire of Dominion Breweries took over and the brewery became known as DB Westland Breweries.

Though run under the DB banner, Westland Breweries for a long time produced beers popular on the Coast and reflecting the history of the brewery as a group enterprise: Westbrew Golden Lager, Tira Pale Ale, Westland Extra Stout, Westbrew Bitter, Monteith's Pale Ale (the first sign of Monteith's as brand), Morley's Special Stout and Westland Golden Draught.

In 1990, when DB was going through its rebranding exercise, it decided to drop the “DB” tag from the brewery name and “create” some history around one of the original driving forces behind West Coast brewing: the Monteith family. It gambled on renaming the brewery Monteith's and creating a range of products under that label.

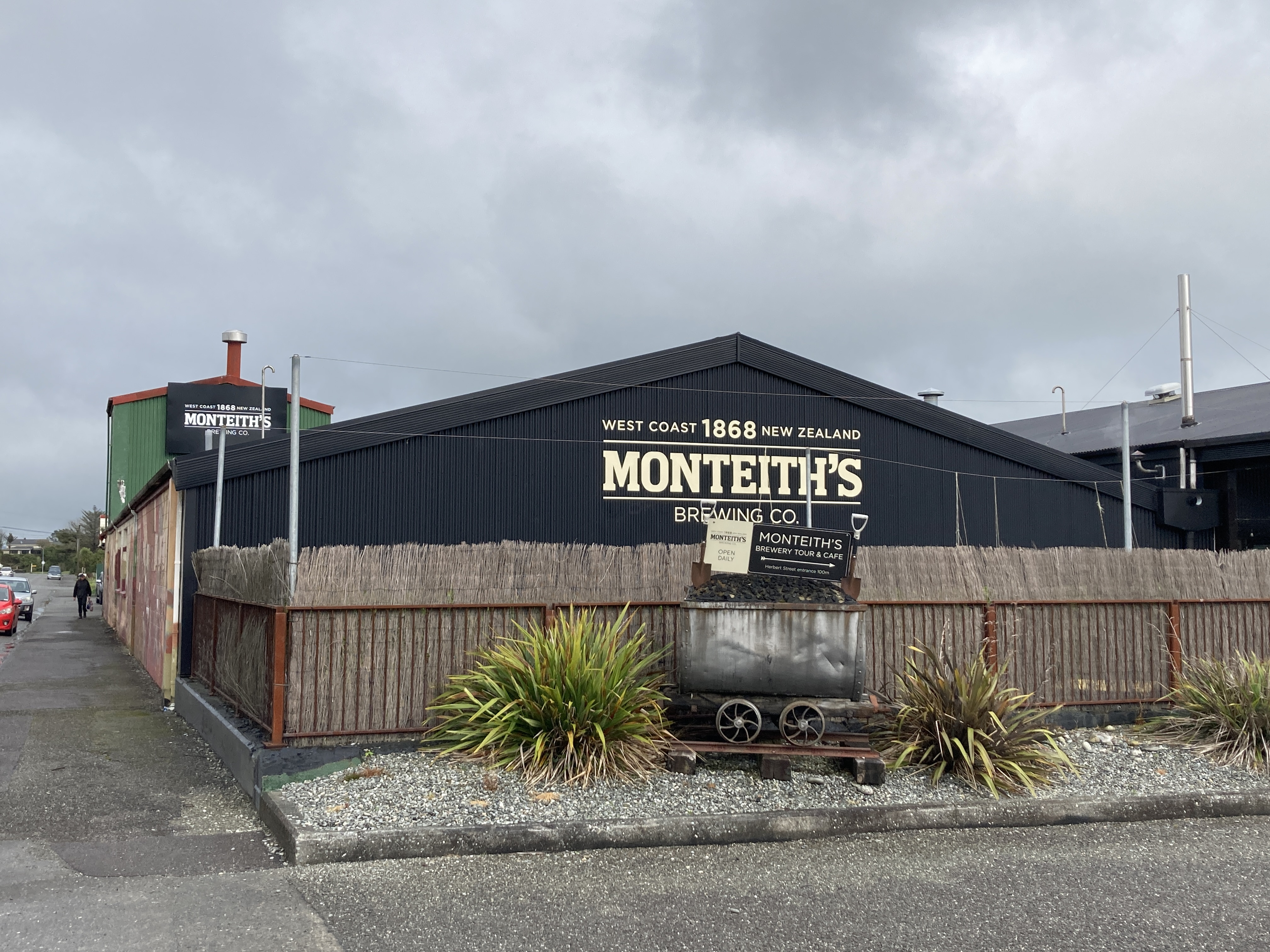
Monteith's Brewery in Greymouth

== Controversy ==
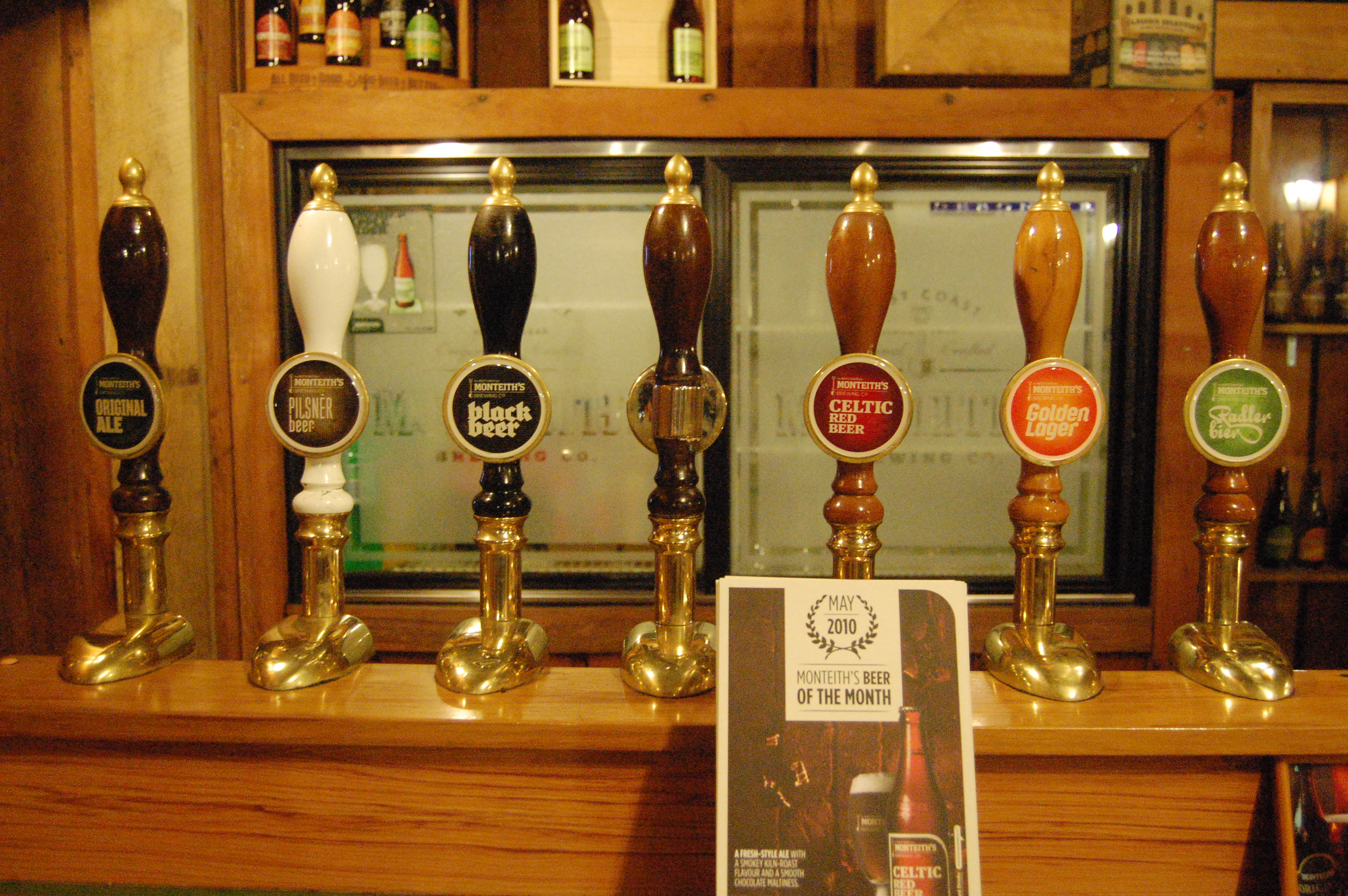
Monteith's Brewery in Greymouth

DB Breweries attracted controversy during a legal battle over the exclusive use of the name Radler. Radler is a style of beer, in the same way that Pilsner or Stout are. However, DB has trademarked the term "Radler" since 2001.

The Society of Beer Advocates asked the Intellectual Property Office of New Zealand (IPoNZ) for the brewery's Radler trademark to be revoked. The issues of this trademark were brought to public attention when a small independent brewery (Green Man Brewery) in Dunedin, Otago released its own Radler (since renamed to Cyclist).

IPoNZ handed down its decision on 14 July 2011. The trademark has been upheld, citing the fact that the term "Radler" was not well known in New Zealand at the time the trademark was taken out.

== Products ==
In addition to the beer varieties listed in the box, Monteith's produces Crushed Apple Cider and Crushed Pear Cider.

== See also ==
- Beer in New Zealand
