= Emerson's Brewery =

New Zealand microbrewery

Coordinates: 45.87050°S 170.51673°E

Emerson's Brewery Limited
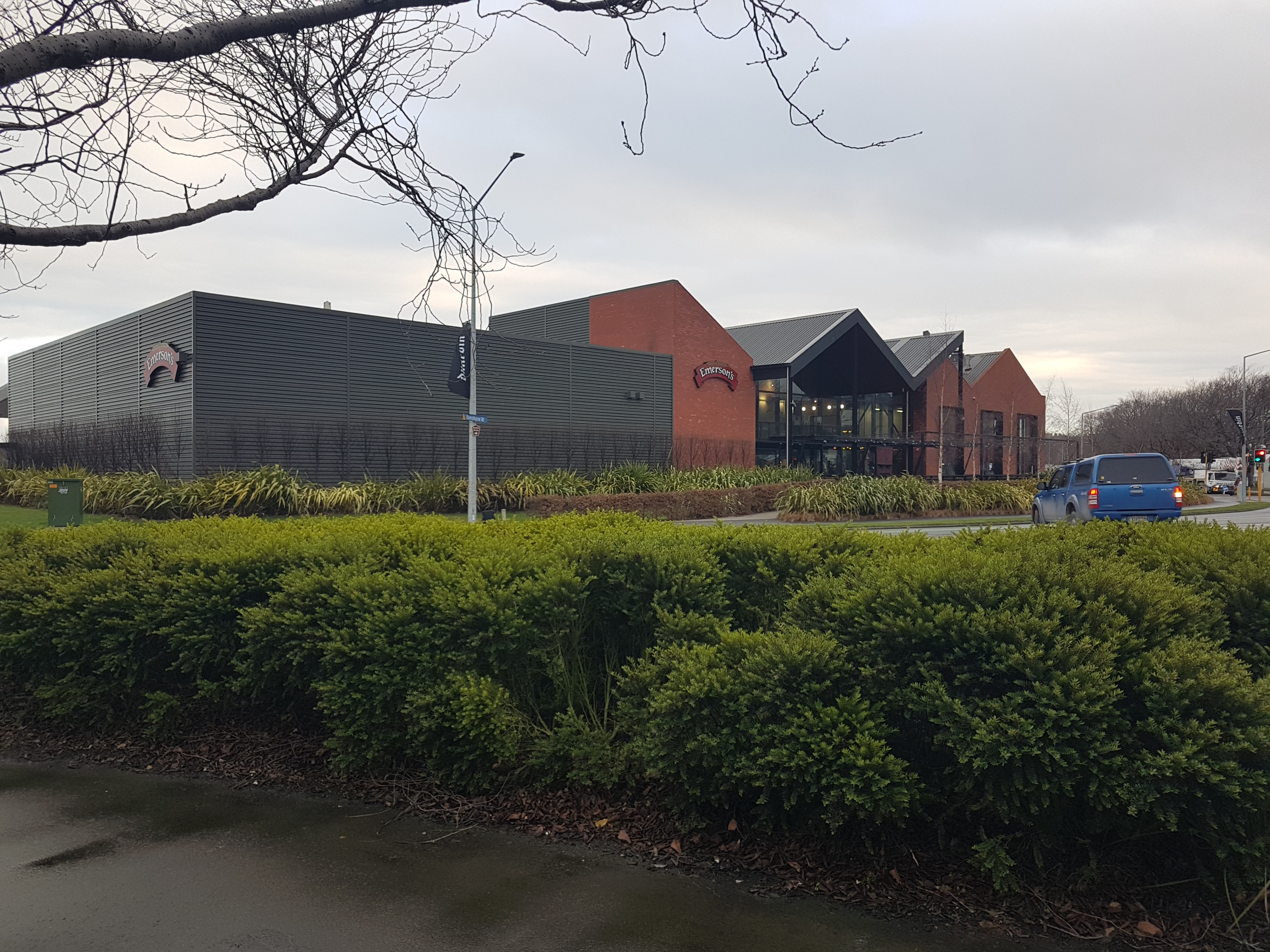
- Emerson's Brewery, Dunedin
- Interactive map of Emerson's Brewery Limited
- Location: Dunedin, New Zealand
- Opened: 1992

Active beers
Name	Type
Bookbinder	Bitter
Big Rig	American Pale Ale
1812	Pale ale
Pilsner	Pilsner
London Porter	Porter
Bird Dog	India Pale Ale

Seasonal beers
Name	Type
JP	Belgian ale
Taieri George	Spiced ale
American Pale Ale	American pale ale

Emerson's Brewery Limited is a microbrewery located in Dunedin, New Zealand established in 1992. Emerson's produces eight year-round beers and three seasonal beers. In November 2012 the brewery was purchased by Australasian company Lion, which in turn is owned by Japanese brewing giant Kirin.

== Richard Emerson ==
When Richard Emerson travelled to Scotland with his parents in 1983 he was first introduced to European style beers. After spending a year in Edinburgh, he returned to New Zealand and became disillusioned with New Zealand beers. This led him to brew for himself.

== Brewing ==
Emerson’s beers are not pasteurised like most mainstream New Zealand beers. The yeast is left alive in the beer to mature and enhance the flavour of the beer. Emerson’s ales are produced from malted barley, hops, yeast and water. They do not have preservatives, added sugar, artificial colouring, have not been pasteurised and some are not filtered.

Some Emerson’s beers are presented in French oak barrels. Pints are sometimes available on hand pump, ensuring that the beer is served at the correct level of carbonation, eliminating gassy beer.

== Beers ==
Emerson's Brewery beers include London Porter, 1812 India Pale Ale, Weissbier, Pilsner, Bookbinder Bitter, Old 95, Maris Gold and Oatmeal Stout.

=== Seasonal brews ===
Taieri George, a 6.8% Belgian-inspired spiced ale, is released every year on 6 March, the birthday of Richard Emerson's father George. It is a bottle-conditioned ale that includes nutmeg, cinnamon and an unnamed spice in its ingredients.

The JP is a Belgian ale introduced as a commemorative tribute to University of Otago food scientist Jean-Pierre Dufour. Sales from the beer assist in funding an Otago University student scholarship established by Emerson's in February 2007. JP is produced annually in June and each vintage reflects a different Belgian beer style.

Southern Clam Stout is a stout brewed with the additional of locally sourced littleneck hard clams.

The company also produces several beers in the American Pale Ale style.

=== Other releases ===
Whiskey Porter is an infusion of dark ale and whisky, achieved by maturing a batch of London Porter in whisky over the course of three to four months. Dunkelweizen is another release.

== Reception ==
The quality of Emerson's beers was praised by English beer critic Michael Jackson, who rated the 1812 India Pale Ale as one of the best 500 beers in the world. Emerson's has won numerous beer awards in Australia and New Zealand.

== See also ==
- Beer in New Zealand
