= 1949 New Zealand gambling referendum =

9 March 1949

Results
Choice	Votes	%
Yes	424,219	68.02%
No	199,406	31.98%

A referendum on gambling was held in New Zealand on 9 March 1949. Voters were asked whether off-course betting on horse races should be allowed. It was approved, with 68% in favour. Voter turnout was 54%. The referendum was held in conjunction with the 1949 New Zealand licensing hours referendum.

== Results ==
Choice	Votes	%
For	424,219	68.02
Against	199,406	31.98
Total	623,625	100.00
Registered voters/turnout	1,148,481	–
Source: Nohlen et al.
