= Double Brown =

Double Brown is a naturally fermented bitter beer. It is produced by DB Breweries in New Zealand, a Heineken subsidiary, containing 4% alcohol by volume. It is considered a low-cost beer since it is priced below mainstream brands owned by the company such as Tui, Export Gold and DB Draught. Double Brown is produced in DB's main brewery in Auckland. It is not marketed as heavily as the brewery's main brands, in order to keep costs as low as possible. It is colloquially referred to as DoBro in New Zealand.

In 2004, Double Brown won the prestigious BrewNZ New Zealand Draught Beer of the Year Award.

In 2009, DB Breweries controversially reduced the iconic "20 box" to 18 cans whilst holding the price constant.

New Zealand band Missing Teeth recorded a song named "Double Brown" as a homage to the brew.

Double Brown is featured in the Lee Tamahori film Once Were Warriors, where bottles can be seen throughout the film. It can also be seen in the 2012 film Two Little Boys.
