= Harrington's Breweries =

New Zealand microbrewery

- Location: Christchurch, New Zealand
- Opened: 1991
- Owned by: Lion

Active beers
Name	Type
Rogue Hop	Pilsner
Wobbly Boot	Porter
Clydesdale Stout	Stout
Pig & Whistle	Mild dark ale
Ngahere Gold	Strong Lager
Yankdak	American Pale Ale

Harrington's Breweries is a microbrewery based in Christchurch, New Zealand.

== History ==
Harrington's Breweries was founded by John and Val Harrington in 1991. The first beer was brewed on 15 July 1991 at the Old Wards Brewery site on Kilmore Street, Christchurch. Their first set up allowed them to make 1000 litres a batch. Demand soon exceeded supply and in 1993 they moved to a much larger location in Ferry Road, Christchurch. The move increased their capacity to 6000 litres per batch. In 2012 they were awarded "Champion Brewery" at the Brewers Guild of New Zealand Awards.

== Today ==
Harrington's Breweries was bought by Lion in July 2018.
