= Lion Red =

Type of large beer

- Manufacturer: Lion (Kirin)
- Introduced: 1907
- Alcohol by volume: 4.0%
- Style: Ale
- Website: www.lionred.co.nz

Lion Red is a New Zealand ale beer brewed by Lion Breweries in Auckland, part of Lion a subsidiary of Japanese beverage conglomerate Kirin. The beer is 4.0% alcohol. Because of its relatively low alcohol content it is widely regarded as an excellent 'session' beer, that is, a beer that can be consumed freely over a long session of time without all the adverse effects of a higher alcohol volume beer. As such, it is also a favourite of university students, along with similar strength beers such as Speights and DB Draught.

== History ==
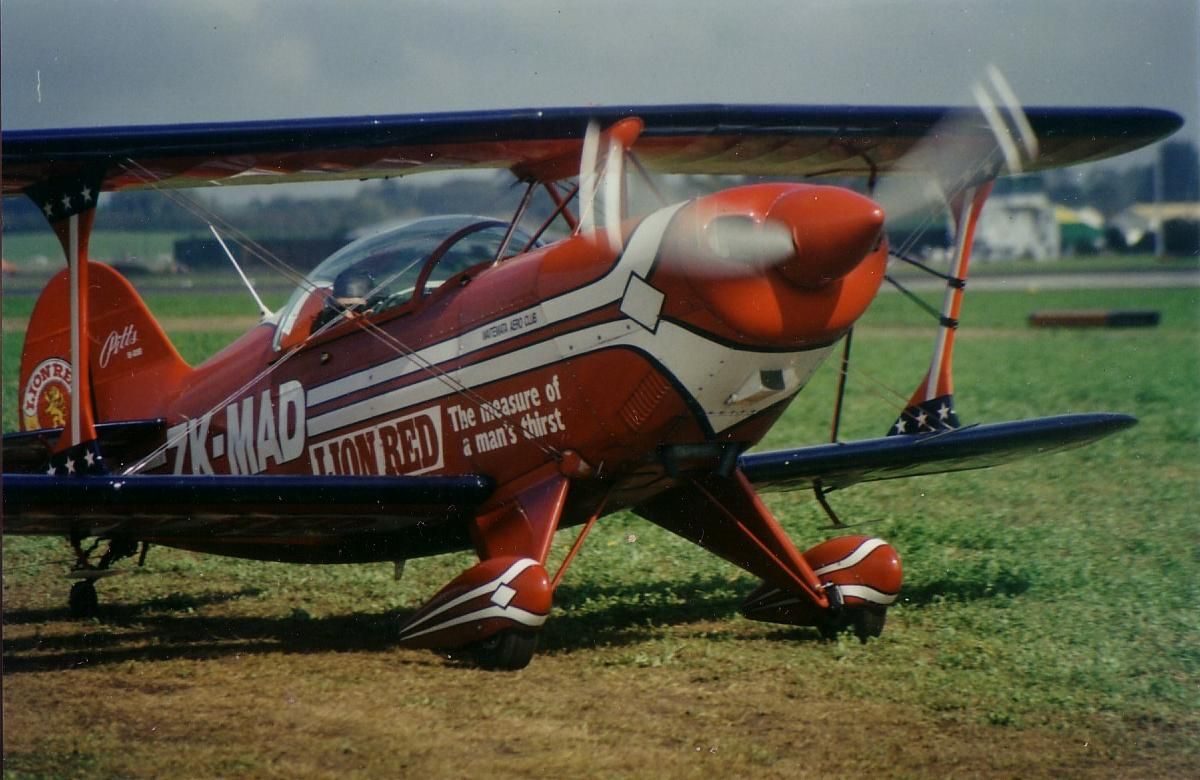
A Pitts Special sponsored by Lion in the 1990s

According to the date on cans and bottles of Lion Red, the beer was established (and thus presumably first brewed) in 1907. The name Lion Red was first adopted by the public to describe the red coloured label and can. Lion Breweries responded by changing the official name from Lion Beer to Lion Red in the mid-1980s.

== Sponsorship ==
=== Rugby League ===
Lion Red has been a longtime sponsor of the New Zealand Rugby League team. Since their introduction into the National Rugby League competition in Australia in 1995 until 2014, the New Zealand Warriors (formerly Auckland Warriors) have also been sponsored by Lion Red. They sponsored the national Lion Red Cup from 1994 to 1996 and currently sponsor Auckland Rugby League's Fox Memorial premier competition.

=== Rugby Union ===
Lion Red sponsor the Northland Taniwhas and Counties-Manukau Steelers in the Mitre 10 Cup competition.
