= Kiwi Access Card =

Identity document issued in New Zealand

- Kiwi access card with the 18+ card
- Type: Identity document
- Issued by: Hospitality New Zealand
- Purpose: To prove a person's age without requiring a driver license
- Eligibility: Available to both NZ nationals and international visitors who are over the age of 18
- Expiration: 10 years
- Cost: $70 including GST for online applications and $75 including GST for applications made in NZ Post or AA stores
- Website: kiwiaccess.co.nz

The Kiwi Access Card, formerly known as the HANZ 18+ Card, is a voluntary identity photo card available to residents of New Zealand over the age of 18. It is available to drivers and non-drivers primarily as an identity document and to access places restricted to persons over the age of 18. The card is issued by Hospitality New Zealand. While it is a government-recognised form of photographic ID and evidence of age card, it is not considered government-issued identification.

== History ==
In October 1999, the Hospitality Association of New Zealand was approved to issue the New Zealand 18+ card by National justice minister Tony Ryall. It was initially available for $20. In November, NZ Post shops began processing applications for cards, and began printing them in December.
