= Waikato Draught =

Beer brand made and sold in New Zealand

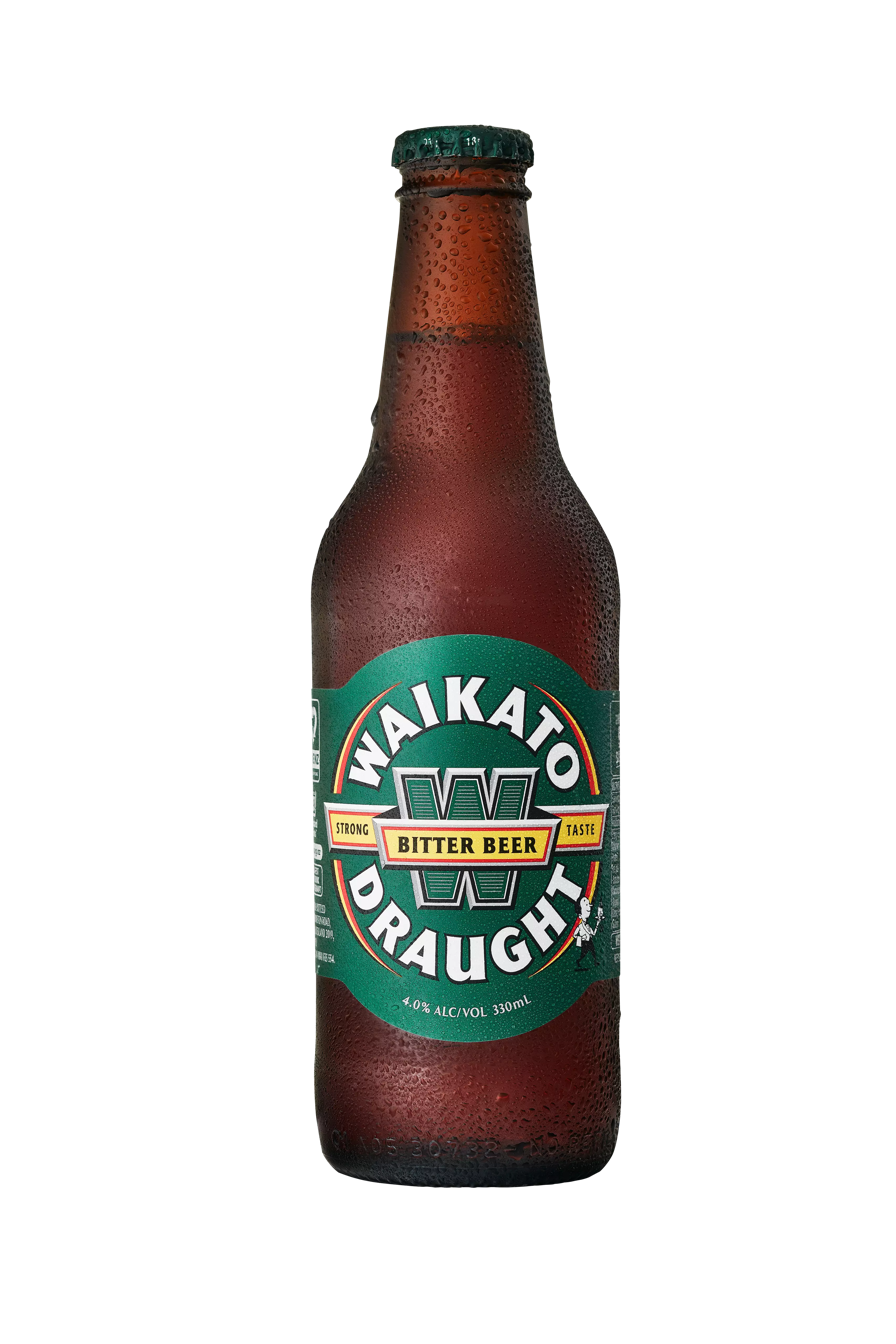
- Manufacturer: Lion Breweries
- Introduced: 1925
- Alcohol by volume: 4.0%
- Style: New Zealand Draught
- Website: www.waikatodraught.co.nz

Waikato Draught is a New Zealand Draught-style Bitter beer brewed by Lion. It is mainly sold in the Waikato region of New Zealand but can also be found in stores elsewhere in New Zealand and abroad.

== History ==
Waikato Draught was first brewed in 1925. According to the brewery, Waikato Draught has a malty flavour with hop bitterness and a spicy aroma. The Waikato Brewery had earlier become the first brewery in New Zealand to be fully owned by a woman after Mary Jane Innes took over management of the brewery in 1889 following the bankruptcy of her husband, Charles Innes.

Willie the waiter, a cartoon character, used to promote the beer as created in 1945 by brewery resident artist Richard Abnett. At this time, Waikato Draught was selling 400,000 gallons of beer each year and being brewed from the Innes Family Waikato Brewery.

In 1961, the New Zealand Breweries (later to become Lion New Zealand Ltd) acquired Waikato Breweries from CL Innes. The brewery stayed open in Hamilton until 1987 when it was closed down. From this time, the production of Waikato Draught was moved to the Lion Breweries in Newmarket, Auckland.

In 2005, Waikato Draught was awarded a gold medal in the NZ draught category at the BrewNZ New Zealand Beer Awards.
