= 1967 New Zealand licensing hours referendum =

- 23 September 1967
- [ ] I favour 6 pm closing as at present. [ ] I favour later closing, the actual hours of sale to be decided according to local conditions.

Results
Choice	Votes	%
6 pm	353,662	35.55%
Later	641,105	64.45%
Valid votes	994,767	100.00%
Invalid or blank votes	0	0.00%
Total votes	994,767	100.00%
Registered voters/turnout	1,430,320	69.55%

A referendum on the hours for the sale of liquor in hotel bars was held in New Zealand on 23 September 1967. Voters were asked whether they favoured continuing the closing of hotel bars at 6 pm or later closing, the actual hours of sale to be decided according to local conditions. The change was favoured by 64.5% of voters.

This referendum voted to abolish six o’clock closing of hotel bars and the six o’clock swill. The 1949 Sale of Liquor referendum had voted to continue six o’clock closing, which had been introduced in 1917.

The referendum was held in conjunction with the 1967 New Zealand parliamentary term referendum. Bar closing times were extended to 10 p.m. on 9 October 1967, three weeks after the referendum.

== Results ==
Choice	Votes	%
For	353,662	35.6
Against	641,105	64.5
Invalid/blank votes		-
Total	994,767	100
