= Morton Coutts =

New Zealand inventor (1904–2004)

Morton Coutts OBE
- Born: Morton William Coutts; 7 February 1904
- Died: 25 June 2004 (aged 100)
- Occupation: Brewer
- Known for: Invention of industrial continuous fermentation process for brewing
- Relatives: Frederick Joseph Kühtze (grandfather)

Morton William Coutts OBE (7 February 1904 – 25 June 2004) was a New Zealand inventor who revolutionised the science of brewing beer. He is best known for the continuous fermentation method.

== History ==
Coutts' German grandfather, Frederick Joseph Kühtze, began brewing beer in Otago, New Zealand in the late 19th century. In 1900 he moved to Palmerston North and set up the family brewery. The brewery was inherited by William Joseph Kühtze, who changed the family name to Coutts during World War I to sound more British. When William Kühtze became seriously ill as a result of the Spanish flu in 1918, Morton Coutts took over the brewery at age 17 with the aid of his mentor, Conor W. Cary.

Morton Coutts took over as director of DB Breweries in 1946.

== Continuous fermentation method ==
In the 1930s, Coutts investigated the nature of yeast which is the most important ingredient in any brewing. Coutts speculated:

...that yeast could be properly controlled if you looked on it as a human being with a brain. It has so many enzyme mechanisms to call upon to react to whatever is necessary for its survival. Instead of looking on the final product I always took notice of the yeast as an organism that produced whatever you ended up with.

This led him to create the wort stabilisation process, which resulted in a clearer and consistent wort. He then separated the fermentation into stages. In the first stage the yeast grew and in the second the fermentation began. The yeast was thus encouraged to either grow or produce alcohol. As a result, Coutts created a continuous flow between the two fermentation processes.

In the 1983 Queen's Birthday Honours, Coutts was appointed an Officer of the Order of the British Empire, for services to the brewing industry.

== Other work ==
Apart from his several patents for the brewing of beer, Coutts was also the first person in New Zealand to broadcast television signals, and was claimed to be the first to send a shortwave radio message to Britain, although as a matter of record, the first New Zealand to Britain radio contact was on 18 October 1924 between Frank D. Bell, Z4AA and Cecil W. Goyder, G2SZ and this was the first ever trans-world two-way radio contact.
