= 1894–1987 New Zealand alcohol licensing referendums =

A number of referendums on alcohol licensing were held in New Zealand between 2 December 1894 and 15 August 1987. Because of their differing questions and rules, these referendums can be broken down into three time periods divided by what options were presented to voters.

== Under the Alcoholic Liquors Sale Control Act of 1893 ==
The Alcoholic Liquors Sale Control Act, 1893 provided that at each general election voters would decide about the alcohol licensing regime. They would choose between 'licensing': the granting of more licenses, 'reduction', where no new licenses would be granted and 'prohibition' - a total ban on alcohol sales. For the prohibition option to pass it had to receive 60% of the valid votes, and if it failed to reach this threshold its vote total would be added to 'reduction'. Under this system, 'reduction' solidly won all six referendums between 1894 and 1908.

== Under the Licensing Amendment Acts of 1910 and 1918 ==
The Licensing Amendment Act of 1910 changed the process above. Now voters would choose between 'licensing' and 'prohibition'. The option to permit licensing narrowly won both the 1911 and 1914 referendums held under this system. The Licensing Amendment Act of 1918 required another referendum before 30 April 1919. This referendum also stated that if prohibition was rejected, in future general elections voters would choose between 'licensing', a 'state monopoly' and 'prohibition'. In the plebiscite voters again narrowly chose licensing over prohibition, though prohibition had been winning until the votes of overseas soldiers (who were strongly in favour of licensing) were counted.

== After the 1919 referendum ==
National Licensing polls were held in conjunction with every general election from 1911 to 1984, except for 1931 and 1951. In 1919 two polls were held, on 10 April 1919 and 17 December 1919.

After the failure of the 30 April 1919 referendum voters at each general election would choose between 'licensing', a 'state monopoly' and prohibition'. Because of the previous failures of prohibition in all referendums, the state monopoly and prohibition options required an absolute majority to pass, with licensing continuing unless that level was reached. In 1919, 1922 and 1925 no option reached a majority and so licensing continued by default. In 1928, licensing reached a majority of the vote for the first time. The vote share of licensing never again declined below a majority, and this option won all following referendums until the entire process was made moot by legal reforms in 1987.

== Local option polls from 1893 ==
From 1893 to 1946 Local Option polls were held in each electorate, although "No-Licence" required a three-fifths (60%) majority, and also that half or more of those on the roll recorded a vote or the vote would be declared "void". Temperance advocates complained that their "democratic right" in those electorates with only a simple majority was denied. As general elections were usually held in October or November, electorates did not go “dry” until the following year generally in June.

In the 1893 election Clutha went "dry", and in the 1902 election Ashburton and Mataura. In Bruce, Chalmers and Newton the poll was declared void. In 1905 election Grey Lynn, Invercargill, and Oamaru went dry. In 1908 election Johnsonville went dry.

With adjustment of electoral boundaries by the Representation Commission because of population changes this led to "repeated major dislocation to liquor licensing districts". From 1914 the Licensing Act required that where possible that no hotel should be placed in a no-licence district. In 1927 the boundary between Parnell and Auckland East was adjusted so that the Ellerslie and Alexandra Park raceways would remain in the "wet" Parnell electorate and could be granted temporary liquor licences on racedays. MP John A. Lee who lost Auckland East in the 1928 election by 37 votes blamed the adjustment for his loss.

== Local option polls after 1987 ==
While the national triennial poll had been abolished in 1987. local restoration polls were held in four "dry" areas in conjunction with the 1996 general election. Grey Lynn recorded a majority for local restoration; Eden, Roskill and Tawa did not. In the 1999 general election all the three remaining areas voted to "go wet".
