= 1949 New Zealand licensing hours referendum =

A referendum on the hours for the sale of liquor in hotel bars was held in New Zealand on 9 March 1949. Voters were asked whether they favoured continuing the closing of hotel bars at 6 pm or extending the closing time to 10 pm. The change was rejected by 75.5% of voters.

This referendum voted to continue six o'clock closing of hotel bars, which had been introduced in 1917, and the six o'clock swill. The Sale of Liquor referendum, 1967 approved the extension of hotel hours.

The referendum was held in conjunction with the 1949 New Zealand gambling referendum.

== Results ==
| Choice | Votes | % |
|---|---|---|
| For | 473,768 | 75.5 |
| Against | 153,850 | 24.5 |
| Invalid/blank votes | | - |
| Total | 627,618 | 100 |
