= DB Breweries =

Brewing company in Auckland, New Zealand

Dominion Breweries Limited
- Type: Subsidiary
- Industry: Beverages
- Founded: 1930
- Headquarters: Auckland, New Zealand
- Products: Beers and lagers
- Parent: Heineken Asia Pacific
- Website: https://www.db.co.nz/

DB Breweries is a New Zealand–based brewing company, owned by Heineken Asia Pacific. Founded in 1930 by Sir Henry Kelliher and W Joseph Coutts, the partners purchased Levers and Co. and the Waitemata Brewery Co. in Ōtāhuhu. Asia Pacific Breweries acquired DB Breweries in 2004, which in turn was bought-out by Heineken International in 2012. The company mainly produces pale lager, whilst its Tui brand is one of the better-known beers in New Zealand, partly due to strong advertising.

== History ==
The company was founded in 1930 by Sir Henry Kelliher with the purchase of Levers and Co. and the Waitemata Brewery Co. in Ōtāhuhu, owned by W.J. Coutts, who became a director.

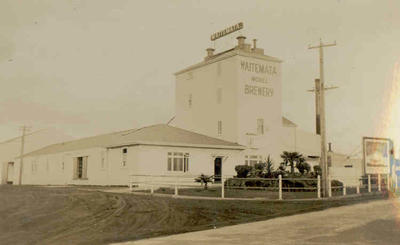
Dominion Brewery, c.1925

Coutts' son, Morton Coutts, took over as director in 1946, and later developed a new production process called "continuous fermentation", which enabled beer to be made continuously, without the need to stop and clean between batches. The system proved popular enough to be sold to other brewing companies.

== Breweries ==
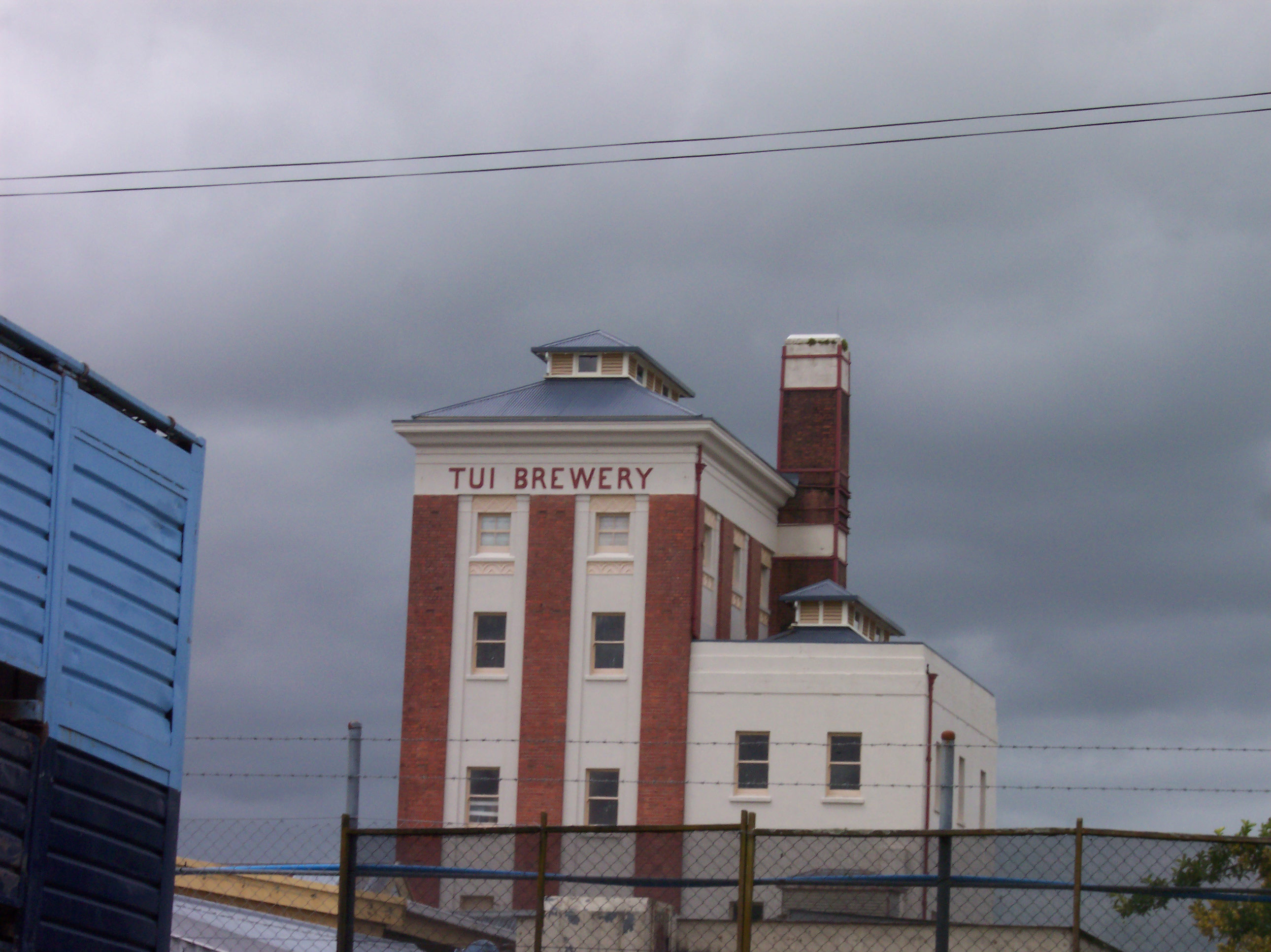
Tui Brewery

DB Breweries (original name was Dominion Brewery) owns and operates several breweries in New Zealand, including Waitemata Brewery (Ōtāhuhu, Auckland), and DB Draught Brewery (Timaru). Mainland Brewery was renamed to DB Draught Brewery in 2012 in honour of the brand's significance in the South Island. DB announced in 2020 that it would cease brewing at its Tui Brewery (Mangatainoka), and Monteith's Brewery (Greymouth).

The Tui Brewery was established in 1889 by Henry Wagstaff and Edward Russell. The main brand is Tui, a 4% abv pale lager, named after a common native New Zealand bird. The New Zealand Consumers' Institute criticised Tui for claiming to be an "East India Pale Ale" because it is a pale lager that bears little resemblance to the traditionally hoppy, bitter or malty India Pale Ale styles.

=== Yeah right ===
Tui was promoted through a humorous advertising campaign which used stereotypes, heavy irony and the phrase Yeah Right. The billboard campaign lasted from 1997 until 2016. These advertisements caused some controversy, such as a billboard in Wellington stating 'Camilla for Queen? Yeah Right' and one stating 'Aucklanders are people too. Yeah Right'. Others to have made the news include "Dad's new husband seems nice - Yeah right" (after New Zealand legalised same-sex marriage); "I nvr txt whl drvn - yeah right"; "When Winston says no, he means no - Yeah right"; "Captain, I know a short cut to the port – Yeah right" (after MV Rena ran aground near Tauranga); "Our father in Heaven, Tamaki be your name – Yeah right"; "She clearly married Dotcom for his body – Yeah right".

In 2010 a church was threatened with legal action after parodying the Tui billboard campaign with the slogan, "Atheists have nothing to worry about – Yeah Right".

== Radler trademark ==
DB trademarked the word Radler in 2003. This was contested in court by the Society of Beer Advocates who lost the case in 2011 when the Intellectual Property Office of New Zealand ruled in favour of DB breweries after a two-year court battle. The Society of Beer Advocates likened this trademark to being able to trademark the word 'Muesli' for cereal and was disappointed in this result as the word radler is commonly used in Europe. This ruling was also labelled as 'out of touch with reality' and condemned by some intellectual property experts in New Zealand.

== Beer ==
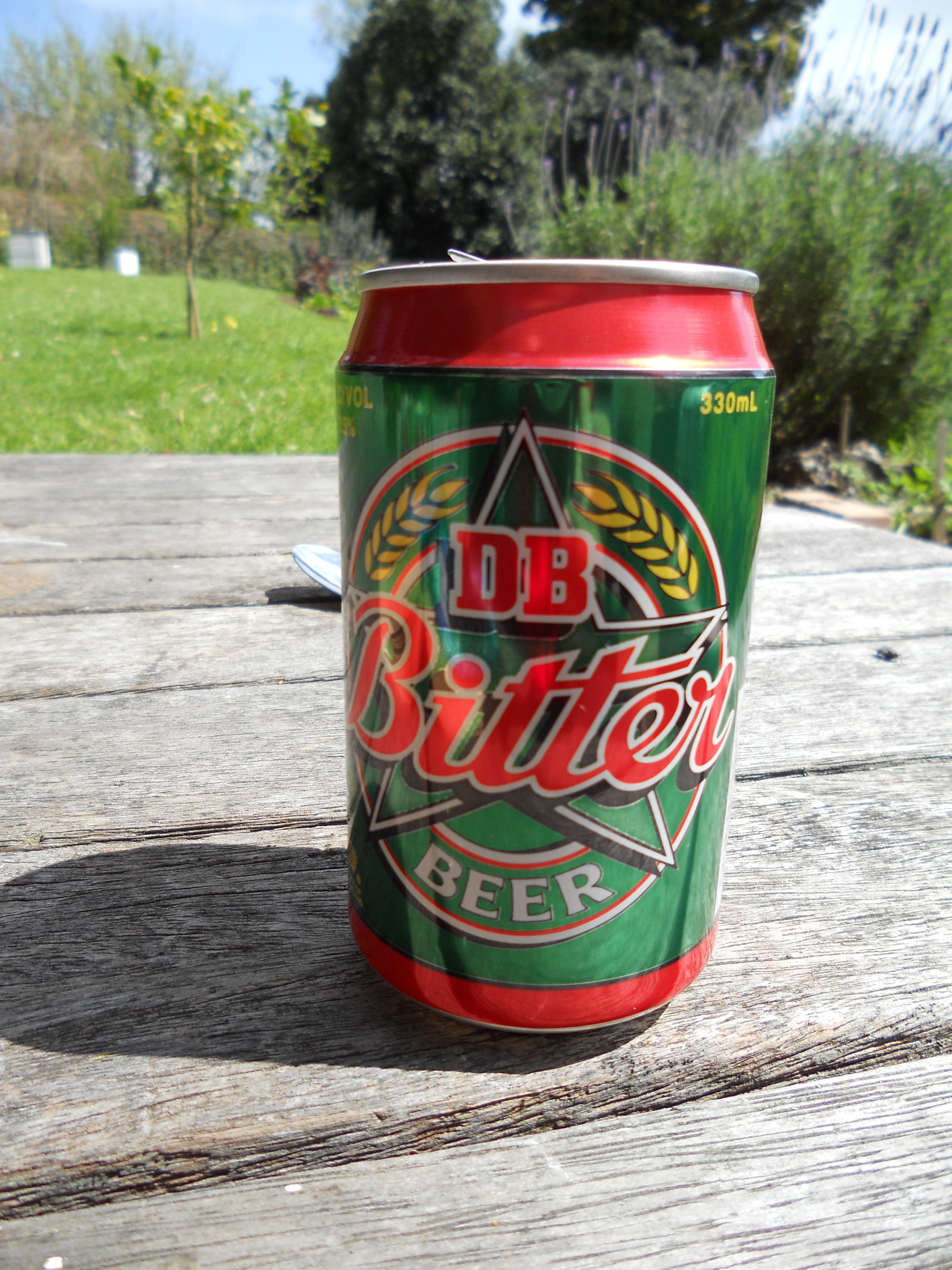
A 330mL can of DB Bitter beer can

- Amstel Light
- Better Beer Company
- Black Dog
- DB Bitter
- DB Draught
- DB Export
- DB Export Dry
- Double Brown
- Flame
- Heineken
- Kingfisher (beer)
- Monteith's
- Murphy's
- Sol
- Tiger
- Tui
- Tuatara

=== Other brands ===
- Orchard Thieves

=== Defunct brands ===
- DB Lager
- DB Natural
- Joseph Kuhtze
- Kiwi Lager
- Mako, a low alcoholic beer (2.5% alcohol/volume)

Most of the brand products (Export 33, Export Dry, Export Gold and Monteith's Single Source) have won a Gold Quality Award at the 2011 annual World Quality Selections, organised by Monde Selection.
