= Beer in Hong Kong =

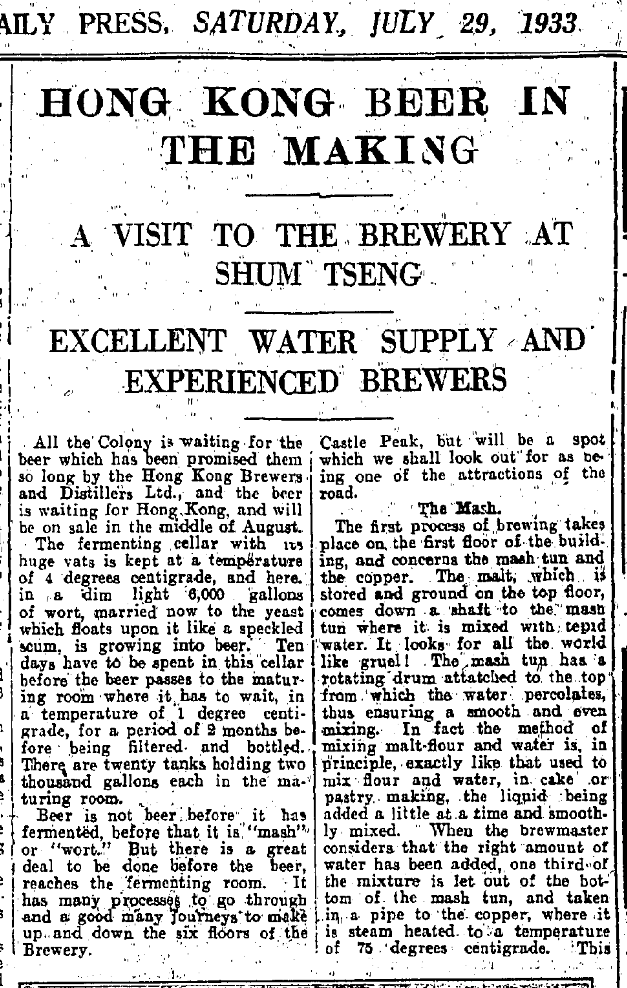
Hong Kong Daily Press reported on 29 July 1933, journalists visited a brewery at Sham Tseng

Bottled beer sold in the Market Place in Hong Kong

The history of beer in Hong Kong dates back to the mid-19th century. Currently the best selling beer is San Miguel, brewed by San Miguel Brewery Hong Kong. San Miguel had been brewed in Sham Tseng since 1948 and later moved to Yuen Long until 2007. The brewery was reopened in 2009.

Carlsberg was also brewed in Tai Po since the 1980s until recently. Blue Girl Beer, a brand owned by the Hong Kong–based trading and distribution company Jebsen & Co., is brewed in South Korea under supervision of Jebsen & Co.

Other notable brands include Tsingtao and Corona. Jolly Shandy is also fairly popular among women and youngsters.

International craft beer and microbrews have seen a rise in popularity since 2010, with specialty and premium beer from countries such as Belgium, the UK, Australia, the US and Japan being more widely available. This has led to the formation of the Craft Beer Association of Hong Kong, made up of distributors, consumers, retailers, bars & restaurants.

== Local Breweries ==
'Hong Kong Beer Co' was started in 1995, though it was originally known as South China Brewing Company. It is the oldest existing local craft brewery. Typhoon Brewery was in business from 2009 to 2014 on Lantau Island. Due to changes in alcohol licensing legislation implemented in the year 2000, brewing beer at home using small scale equipment and ingredients, commonly referred to as "home brewing", is now permissible in Hong Kong within limits.

List of Hong Kong Beer Companies
Brewery Name	Chinese Name	Established	Closed	Brewery Location	Notes
Black Kite Brewery	黑鳶	2015		Wong Chuk Hang	
Carbon Brews	-	2018		Fo Tan	
City Brew	城釀	2014		Kwai Chung	
Deadman Brewery	-				
Fat Rooster Brewing	肥雞啤酒	2014	2016	Wong Chuk Hang	
Gweilo Beer	鬼佬啤酒	2015		Chai Wan	
Heroes Beer Co.	人一世物一世點都要做一次啤酒英雄有限公司	2016		Yau Tong	
HK Brewcraft	-	2013		Central	
H.K. Lovecraft	-	2017		Tsing Yi	Specialize in craft lager
Hong Kong Beer Co.	香港啤酒有限公司	1995		Chai Wan	Formerly the South China Brewing Company.
Hong Kong Whistle	吹啤啤	2016		Ngau Tau Kok	
Kowloon Bay Brewery	九龍灣釀酒廠	2015		Tsuen Wan	
Kung Fu Lager	功夫啤酒	2020		Tsuen Wan	
Lion Rock Brewery	獅子山啤	2015		Kwai Chung	
Little Creatures Brewing	-	2000	2020	Kennedy Town	Local brewery for Fremantle-based Little World Beverages (a wholly owned subsidiary of Lion Nathan)
Lucky Dawgs	幸運狗	2016	2019	North Point	
Mak's Beer	麥氏釀酒	2014		Tsuen Wan	
Meow Beer	貓啤	2015		Kwun Tong	
Moonzen Brewery	門神啤酒	2014		Kwun Tong	
Nine Dragons Brewery	九龍啤酒	2013		Sheung Wan	
San Miguel Brewery	生力啤	1948		Yuen Long	Facility closed in 2007, re-open in 2009
The Artist Brewery	-	2015		Wong Chuk Hang	Made in Belgium
Typhoon Brewery	颱風酒廠	2009	2014	Mui Wo	The first brewery in Hong Kong to make English-style cask ale.
Yardley Brothers	-	2014		Kwai Hing	
Young Master Ales	少爺麥啤	2013		Ap Lei Chau	

== See also ==
- Lan Kwai Fong
- Oktoberfest Hong Kong
- Beer and breweries by region
