= McCashin =

McCashin is a surname. Notable people with the surname include:

- Arthur McCashin (1909–1988), American equestrian
- Constance McCashin (born 1947), American psychotherapist and actor
- Terry McCashin (1944–2017), New Zealand businessman

== See also ==
- McCashins Brewery, a New Zealand brewery
