= The Beer Factor =

Australian television series

- Genre: variety television
- Presented by: Tom Gleeson
- No. of seasons: 1
- No. of episodes: 6

Original release
- Network: GO!
- Release: 1 September – 29 September 2012

The Beer Factor is an Australian television series in five parts about beer, which debuted on 9Go! (then GO!) on 1 September 2012 and ended on 29 September 2012. It is hosted by Tom Gleeson. The show was sponsored by Hahn Brewery and its parent company Lion.
