= Gweilo Beer =

Hong Kong craft brewery

Gweilo Beer (Chinese: 鬼佬啤酒) is a craft brewery founded in July 2014 in Hong Kong. It released its first beer in June 2015.

== History ==
Gweilo Beer was established by Ian and Emily Jebbitt and Joseph Gould in July 2015. The three founders are from Britain. Gweilo or gwailou is a common Cantonese slur term for Westerners. In the absence of modifiers, it refers to white people and literally translates to "ghost chap". Gweilo Beer became Hong Kong's largest craft-beer brewery in 2018 after opening a factory in Fo Tan. The venue used a canning device from Italy that cost US$1.2 million and had an hourly manufacturing capacity of 6,000 cans.

== Products ==
Gweilo Beer produces a pale ale and an IPA. Gweilo Beer's recipes were created for the Hong Kong market, and both beers are English-style session beers with 4.5% and 4.8% ABV, respectively. The Gweilo IPA won Best British Style at the 2015 Hong Kong International Beer Awards. They also produce Betsy for Cathay Pacific, which is exclusively served aboard long-haul flights and in the Cathay lounges at Hong Kong International Airport.

== See also ==
- Beer in Hong Kong
- Gweilo
