= Malt Shovel Brewery =

Australian brewery

- Industry: Alcoholic beverage
- Founded: 1998; 28 years ago
- Headquarters: 99-101 Pyrmont Bridge Road, Camperdown, New South Wales, Australia
- Products: Beer
- Owner: Lion (Kirin)
- Website: http://www.malt-shovel.com.au/ Malt Shovel Brewery website

The Malt Shovel Brewery is an Australian brewery owned by Lion, a subsidiary of the Japanese conglomerate Kirin. It is located in Camperdown, New South Wales. Malt Shovel is best known for its James Squire range of beers. The beer is named after the convict turned Australia's first brewer James Squire, who also went on to grow Australia's first hops and is said to have created Australia's first commercial brewery.

== History ==
In 1988, master brewer Chuck Hahn established the Hahn Brewery (then Australia's largest microbrewery) in a former horse stables and later furniture factory, in Camperdown, an inner-city suburb of Sydney. In 1993, the boutique beer-making operation received financial support from Lion. In late 1998, the brewery was relaunched as the Australian craft-brewing arm of Lion, and was renamed the Malt Shovel Brewery, after the James Squire's original brewery tavern ("The Malting Shovel"). The Malt Shovel Brewery produces boutique beers in small batches and in honour of Australia’s first brewer, the brewery named their range of pale ales, ales and porters 'James Squire'. In 2003, the business produced four million litres of beer and in 2010 it had increased to 4.74 million litres. In 2008, the brewery acquired the adjoining building, which allowed the company to expand both its production and storage facilities.

The company has also established a number of brewpubs, with the Crafty Squire Brewhouse on Russell Street, Melbourne, the Squire's Maiden on Honeysuckle Drive, Newcastle, the Squire's Fortune on The Esplanade, Perth, the Generous Squire on Murray Street, Perth, the Curious Squire on O’Connell Street, North Adelaide, and the Charming Squire on Grey Street, Brisbane.

In 2017, new brewhouses were opened in Sydney and in Hobart.

== Public access ==
The brewery is generally not accessible to the public. However, the brewery does welcome visitors each October during Sydney Craft Beer Week.

== Beers ==
=== James Squire regular beers ===
The Malt Shovel Brewery produces a number of main brews under the James Squire brand, each with a moniker related to the James Squire story:

- One Fifty Lashes Pale Ale
- Nine Tales Original Amber Ale is a handcrafted English-style Brown Ale, consisting of a blend of Pale and Crystal malts, three distinct hops, and a 140-year-old top fermenting ale yeast. (Silver medal 2008 Australian International Beer Awards, Bronze medal 2009 AIBA, Silver medal 2012 AIBA) Alcohol content: 5.0%
- Four Wives Pilsener is brewed using Pale and Munich malts, Saaz hops and lager yeast. (winner of 'Best Pilsner' at the 2002 Australian International Beer Awards, Silver medal 2008 AIBA, Bronze medal 2009 AIBA, Silver medal 2010 AIBA, Bronze medal 2013 AIBA) Alcohol content: 5.0%
- Stowaway India Pale Ale (I.P.A.) has robust malty flavours and earthy floral aromas from dry hopping with English Fuggles hops. (Silver medal 2008 Australian International Beer Awards, Bronze medal 2009 AIBA, Silver medal 2010 AIBA) Alcohol content: 5.6%
- Jack of Spades Porter is a dark beer consisting of five different malts combined with roasted barley and wheat. Porter has a longer maturation than the other James Squire brews. (Gold medal 2002 Australian International Beer Awards, Silver medal 2008 & 2010 AIBA, Bronze medal 2011 & 2012 AIBA) Alcohol content: 5.0%
- Chancer Golden Ale is an English-style Summer Ale, created with toasted grains of wheat and barley, combined with new season Amarillo hops. (Silver medal 2008 Australian International Beer Awards, Silver medal 2009 & 2010 AIBA, Bronze medal 2011 AIBA, Silver medal 2012 AIBA) Alcohol content: 4.5%
- Orchard Crush an apple cider using a blend of Granny Smith, Pink Lady and Red Delicious apples from the Orange and Mildura regions. Alcohol content: 4.8%

=== James Squire limited edition brews ===
Every three months the brewery creates limited edition beers under the James Squire brand which are available in its James Squire brewhouses and via selected liquor retailers. These beers are produced in much smaller quantities than the regular brews. Some examples have been:

- James Squire The Hop Father. IBU: 35. ABV: 5.0. Style: Hoppy Pale Ale (Limited Edition). Hops: Simcoe & Columbus
- James Squire Hop Thief. (Currently 10th edition). IBU: 42. ABV: 5.3. Style: American Pale Ale using unique or new hops. Hops: Sabro, Simcoe, Mosaic and Galaxy (10th edition).
- James Squire Chancer 'Brewers Edition. IBU: 34. ABV: 4.5%. Style: Golden Ale. Hops: Amarillo, Summer, Topaz, Cascade. Malts: Pale, Munich, Crystal, Wheat.
- Australian Strong Ale
- Rum Rebellion Porter
- Pepperberry Winter Ale

Previously brewed brews

- Sundown Lager - 2009 Bronze medal Australian International Beer Awards, 2010 Gold Medal AIBA, Silver Medal 2011 & 2012 AIBA. This beer has not been made since Oct 2015.
- The Constable Copper Ale

=== Malt Shovel Brewers (formerly Mad Brewers) ===
In addition to beers brewed under the James Squire brand, the brewers at Malt Shovel Brewery also release limited edition beers under their own brand. Recent releases has been:

- Interceptor Black IPA Released April 2017: IBU: 50. ABV: 6.1%. Style: Black IPA. Hops: Victoria Secret, Centennial, Cascade, Mosaic. Malts: Pale, Vienna, Crystal, Melanoidin, Midnight Wheat
- La La Lager Released Dec 2016: IBU: 42. ABV: 6.5%. Style: Lager. Hops: Tettnang, Magnum, Northern Brewer, Centennial, Citra. Malts: Pale, Malted Wheat, Carapils, Caraaroma
- Hoppy Hefe Released Oct 2016: IBU: 35. ABV: 7%. A bold lager with a zesty hit of citrus and a powerful spicy finish. Style: American Wheat Ale. Hops: Citra, Motueka. Malts: Pale, Munich, Wheat.

Previous brews:

- Australian White Beer is brewed using fresh wheat, extremely pale malt and Willamette hops. ABV: 5.0%
- Noir Stout an imperial-style stout, brewed with pale chocolate, dark crystal barley malts, roasted black wheat malt, Australian Super Pride hops, New Zealand Super Alpha hops and powdered liquorice root. ABV: 7%
- Hoppe Hefe brewed using a blend of Citra and Motueka hops along with wheat barley. (Silver medal 2012 Australian International Beer Awards) ABV: 7.0%
- Wee Highlander a rich, full-bodied Scotch Ale brewed using peated malt. ABV: 6.7%
- Garden De Paradisi launched mid-February 2014. ABV: 6.2%
- Ginger Chops Ale a ginger beer made from an authentic balanced beer with spicy ginger and Australian honey. ABV: 4.2%
- Scribbly Gum Lager (Bronze medal 2011 Australian International Beer Awards) ABV: 6.7%

=== Others ===
- Kosciuszko Pale Ale, first brewed at the Kosciuszko Brewery (established by Chuck Hahn in April 2009 in Jindabyne, New South Wales) it is also now produced and bottled at the Malt Shovel Brewery. (Bronze Medal 2012 Australian International Beer Awards) Alcohol content: 4.5%
- TEN20 Commemorative Ale

== Awards ==
Malt Shovel Brewery has won numerous awards, medals and trophies world wide for their permanent range of products. The most notable awards include:

- Australian International Beer Awards
  - 2000 Champion Australasian Brewery
  - 2003 Champion Australasian Brewery
  - 2003 James Squire Amber Ale (subsequently renamed Nine Tales Original Amber Ale) won Champion Lager
- World Beer Cup
  - 2006 - Chancer Golden Ale received the bronze award in the English-style Summer Ale category.
  - 2008 - Four ‘Wives’ Pilsener received the gold award in the Bohemian-style Pilsener category.
  - 2010 - New Norcia Abbey Ale received the gold award in the Other Belgian-style Ale category.
  - 2016 - James Squire The Swindler received the gold award in the Summer Ale category.

== See also ==
- Australian pub
- Beer in Australia
- List of breweries in Australia
- Murwillumbah Swamp Beer
