= West End Brewery =

West End Brewery may refer to:

- West End Brewery (Hindley Street), brewery founded in Adelaide in 1857, taken over by the South Australian Brewing Company in 1888
- The premises in Hindley Street after the takeover by the South Australian Brewing Company
- The premises at 107 Port Road, Thebarton, after the sale of the Hindley Street building in 1980, later rebadged by the Lion company as West End
