= Hahn Brewery =

NSW Beer brewing company

- Industry: Alcoholic beverage
- Founded: 1988; 38 years ago
- Founder: Charles Hahn
- Headquarters: Auburn, New South Wales, Australia
- Products: Beer
- Owner: Lion
- Website: http://www.hahn.com.au/

Hahn Brewery was established by Dr Charles Hahn in 1988 at an old factory site in the suburb of Camperdown in Sydney, New South Wales, Australia. Originally focussing on pale lagers, such as Hahn Premium and Hahn Premium Light, targeted at the mid-price sector of the market, the 1991-93 recession resulted in reduced demand, and led to the brewery being purchased by Australia's second largest brewer Lion in 1993. A lower cost beer called Sydney Bitter was produced, with reasonable success. It has launched two new beers since then: Hahn Super Dry in 2006 and Hahn Super Dry 3.5 in 2009.

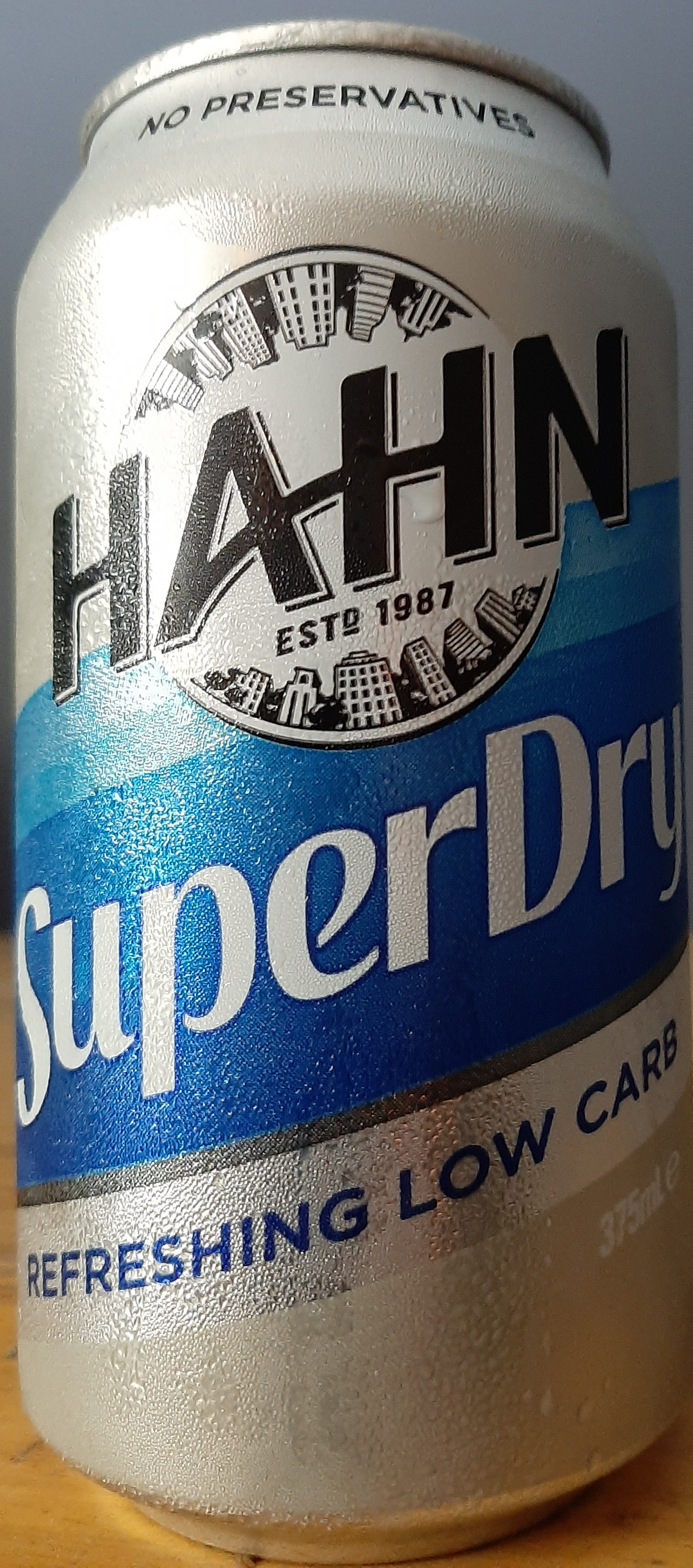
Hahn Super Dry Full Strength. ALC/VOL 4.6%. 375mL can

Hahn was appointed as the Chief Brewer of Lion Co which, at the time, operated eight breweries in Australia and New Zealand and two in China. Production of Hahn beers was moved to the Tooheys brewery in Auburn. The Camperdown brewery itself was renamed to the Malt Shovel Brewery in honour of the 1st fleet convict turned Australia's first brewer, James Squire. To this day, Hahn still plays a key role in brewing the craft beers at the Malt Shovel Brewery.

== Sponsorship ==
In 2012, Hahn sponsored the beer television series The Beer Factor, which aired on 9Go! and the Nine Network.

On 25 November 2024, it was announced that beverage company Hahn would become the naming rights sponsor of the Australia Cup from 2025 onwards, in a three-year deal.

In July 2026, Hahn was announced as the official beer of the Wallabies, after a two-year sponsorship deal with Rugby Australia.

== Products ==
Current Products
Beer	ABV
Hahn Ice Beer	4.6%
Hahn Premium Light	2.2%
Hahn Super Dry	4.6%
Hahn Super Dry 3.5	3.5%
Hahn Ultra	0.9%
Hahn Radler	3.2%
Hahn Ultra Crisp	4.2%

Past Products
Beer	ABV
Hahn Harvest Premium Ale	4.9%
Hahn Pale Ale	4.6%
Hahn Premium	4.6%
Hahn Premium Australian Pilsener	4.0%
Hahn Special Vintage 2000 Millennium Ale	4.4%
Hahn Vienna Red	4.6%
Hahn White	5.7%
Hahn Witbier	5.2%

== See also ==
- Australian pub
- Beer in Australia
- List of breweries in Australia
