= Little World Beverages =

Beverage and hospitality company headquartered in O'Connor, Western Australia

Little World Beverages Pty Ltd
- Type: Subsidiary
- Industry: Brewing; Beverage distribution; Hospitality and entertainment
- Founded: November 2000; 25 years ago Fremantle, Western Australia
- Headquarters: O'Connor, Western Australia, Australia
- Key people: Ian Cochrane (chairman); Ross Sudano (CEO); Nic Trimboli (director); Jamie Tomlinson (director); David Martin (director); Adrian Fini (director); Jason Markwart (CFO); Alex Troncoso (chief brewer)
- Products: Little Creatures ales; White Rabbit ales; Pipsqueak Cider; Aspall Cyder (Australian distribution)
- Parent: Lion
- Subsidiaries: Little Creatures Brewing, Little Green Steps, Fremantle Harbour Properties
- Website: www.littleworldbeverages.com

Little World Beverages Pty Ltd (LWB) is an Australian beverage and hospitality company, best known for its ownership of the Little Creatures brewery. Although often associated with the independent craft brewery movement in Australia, Little World Beverages is owned by the giant Japanese-controlled beverages company Lion Nathan, who acquired the company in 2012.

The company was launched in November 2000 by several ex-staff and shareholders of the Matilda Bay Brewing Company (which had been sold to Carlton & United Beverages). The company was listed on the Australian Stock Exchange on 20 October 2005, using the ticker symbol LWB.

== Brewing ==
Little Creatures Brewing is the brewing subsidiary of Little World Beverages and currently operates out of one brewery in Fremantle, Western Australia, with a second brewery built in Geelong, Victoria, which opened Tuesday 10 December 2013.

The brewery has a stable of four beer brands.

Little Creatures Pale Ale was the brewery's original beer and continues to be its flagship; a mid strength ale (Rogers) is also brewed, along with a pilsner, and a light ale (Little Creatures Bright Ale).

Alongside these staples brands, Little Creatures also produce single-batch releases, in pint-sized (568 ml) bottles. Examples have included a brown ale, an "imperial" India pale ale, a märzen, and an oatmeal stout.

In March 2009, LWB opened a second operation, White Rabbit brewery, in Healesville, Victoria. White Rabbit is a smaller operation than Little Creatures, with distinct branding and products. They market various ales including White Rabbit Dark Ale and White Rabbit White Ale. The Healesville brewery is also where the Pipsqueak Cider is produced.

A second Little Creatures brewery was constructed at a former woolen mill site in Geelong Victoria, with construction completed in late 2013.

In February 2009, LWB bought a 20% stake in the Stone & Wood Brewing Co. based in Byron Bay, New South Wales. In 2012 Cook, Rogers and Jurisich bought back the share of its business held by Lion following that company's takeover of Little World Beverages.

Lion purchased New Belgium Brewing Company out of Fort Collins, CO in late 2019.

== Hospitality and entertainment ==
Little World Beverages operates three hospitality/entertainment venues: one in Fremantle in Western Australia; Little Creatures Dining Hall in Fitzroy, Victoria; and White Rabbit Cellar Door in Healesville, Victoria.

== Distribution ==
Little World Beverages is the exclusive Australian distributor of Aspall Cyder, one of England's oldest cider brands.
