= Steinlager =

New Zealand beer

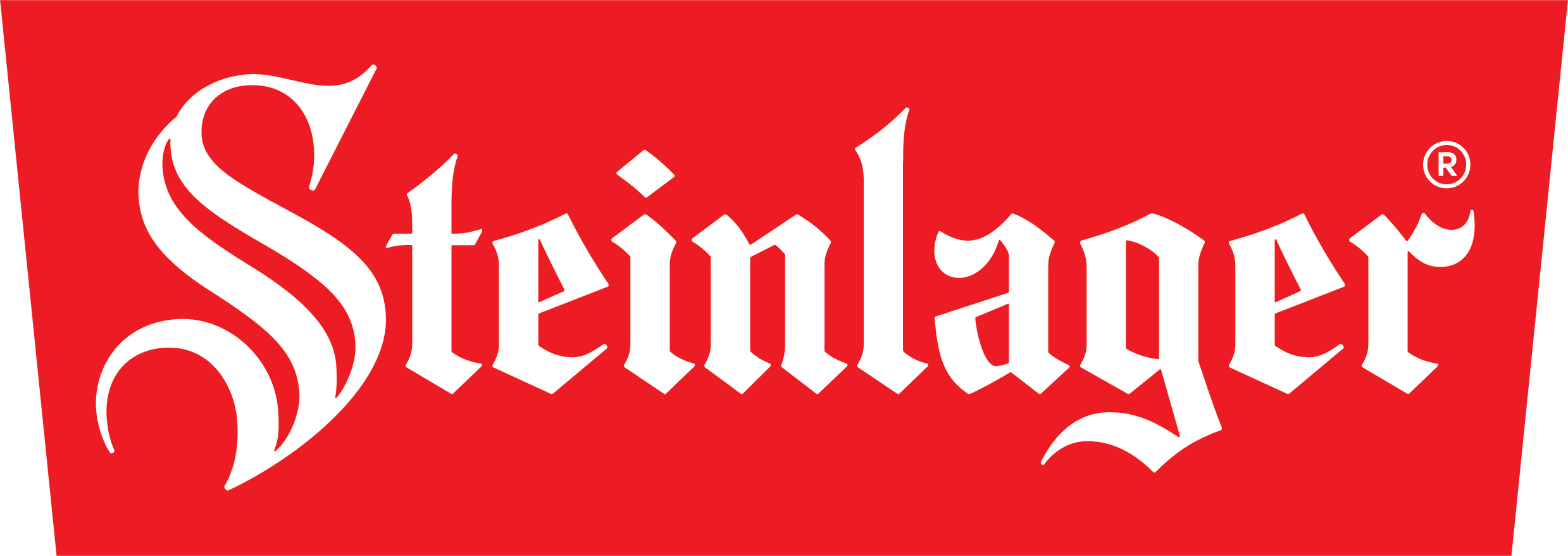

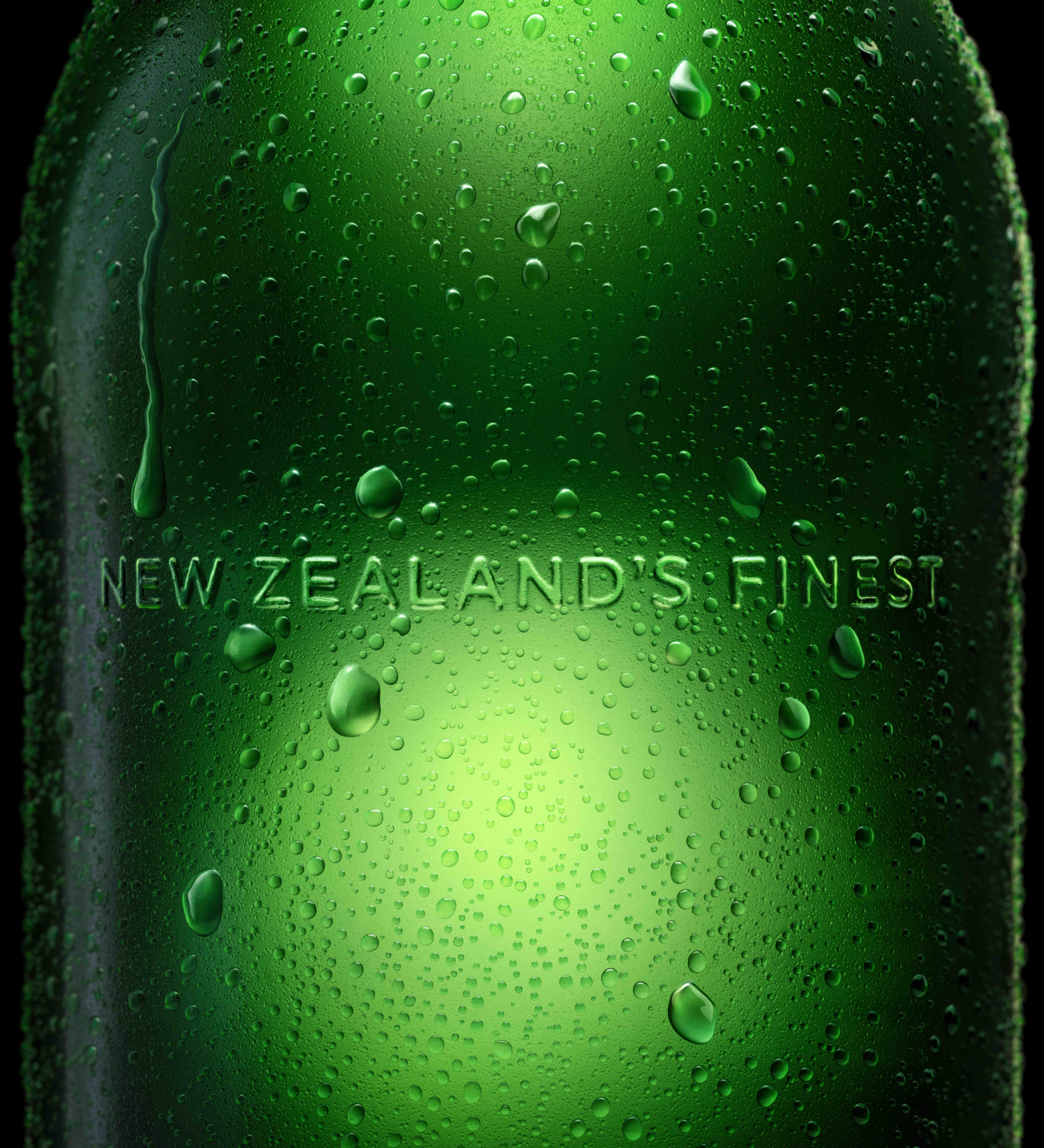
- Type: New Zealand Lager
- Manufacturer: Lion (Kirin) New Zealand Ltd
- Origin: New Zealand
- Introduced: 1958
- Website: https://www.steinlager.com/

Steinlager (sometimes known as Steinlager Classic) is a lager-style beer brewed by Lion in East Tāmaki, a suburb of Auckland, New Zealand. First introduced in 1958, the brand became one of New Zealand's most internationally recognised beers through export growth, international brewing awards and sporting sponsorships with Team New Zealand and the All Blacks.

It has won numerous awards, most notably winning the 'Les Amis du Vin' four consecutive years in a row during the late 1970s and early 1980s. Steinlager is also one of New Zealand's largest beer exporters and has long used the slogan "New Zealand’s Finest" in its marketing and branding.

Originally centred on Steinlager Classic, the brand later expanded to include additional variants including Steinlager Pure, Tokyo Dry, Ultra Low Carb and Alcohol Free.

== History ==
=== Origins and launch (1958–1962) ===
Steinlager is a New Zealand lager beer brand introduced in 1958 by New Zealand Breweries Ltd, now part of Lion. The beer was originally launched under the name Steinecker following restrictions on imported beer introduced during the 1958 "Black Budget" by Minister of Finance Arnold Nordmeyer. The restrictions encouraged domestic brewers to produce beers capable of competing with imported international lagers.

The beer was originally launched under the name Steinecker, named after the company whose equipment the beer was made in. The beer's name was changed in 1962, not in response to a challenge from the Steinecker company, but to distinguish it from Heineken. In 1962, the brand was renamed Steinlager, adopting the name under which it would later become internationally recognised.

=== International growth and awards (1970s–1980s) ===
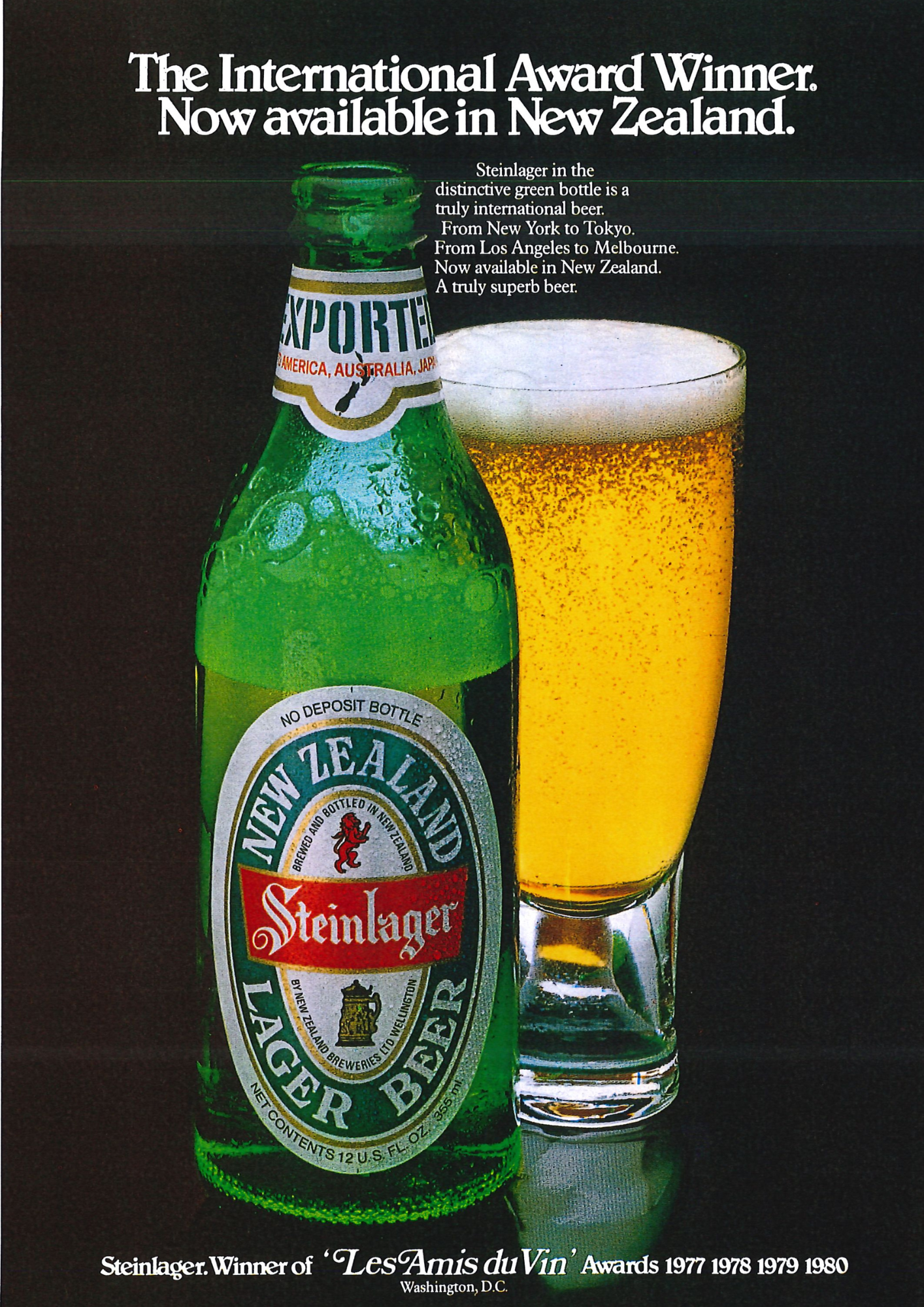
1981 promotional poster from Steinlager

During the 1970s, Steinlager expanded into export markets including the United States and Japan. In 1973, an American consultant suggested that to become successful the company should change the colour of their bottles to match that of other premium beers. As a result, the original brown bottle colour was changed to green for export sales, while continuing to use brown bottles domestically.

Steinlager received several international brewing awards during the late 1970s and 1980s. The beer won multiple Les Amis du Vin awards in the United States and received recognition at the Brewing Industry International Awards in Burton upon Trent, England. In 1980, Steinlager was awarded the Les Amis du Vin award for the fourth consecutive year and according to the Steinlager brand, they were reportedly "asked not to re-enter the competition".

=== Sporting Sponsorships and national identity (1980s–1990s) ===
In 1986, Steinlager became an official sponsor of the All Blacks, who are considered a core pillar of New Zealand's national identity.

Steinlager became closely associated with New Zealand yachting during the 1980's through sponsorship of multiple international sailing campaigns. In 1986, Steinlager sponsored New Zealand's challenge for the America's Cup in Fremantle, Australia, including the yacht KZ7, nicknamed the "Plastic Fantastic". Steinlager later supported the New Zealand challenge for the 1992 America's Cup with NZL20, and remained associated with Team New Zealand during its successful 1995 America's Cup campaign in San Diego.

=== Product expansion and rebranding (1990s–2010s) ===
Steinlager expanded beyond its flagship lager into additional variants and product lines. Steinlager Blue was reintroduced in 1991, followed by Steinlager Premium Light in 2000. In 2007, Lion launched Steinlager Pure, a premium lager positioned as a modern extension of the Steinlager brand. The product was later expanded into international markets including Australia and the United Kingdom.

Steinlager continued to introduce new packaging and branding initiatives throughout the 2010s, including limited edition cans linked to sporting sponsorships and the launch of Steinlager Tokyo Dry in 2016.

=== Sustainability and recent developments (2020's- Present) ===
In 2021, Steinlager announced that parts of its product range had received Toitū net carbon zero certification through Toitū Envirocare. The certification assessed emissions generated across the product lifecycle, including agricultural production, brewing, packaging, distribution and refrigeration during retail and consumer use. Emissions that could not be eliminated were offset through accredited carbon reduction projects, including investment in a wind energy project in Tamil Nadu, India. The certification also committed Steinlager to ongoing annual reductions in carbon emissions. In 2024, Steinlager launched a pilot returnable bottle programme in partnership with Datacom and Super Liquor as part of a broader circular packaging initiative. Due to its success, the trial was reintroduced in 2026 across 48 Super Liquor stores in the Auckland Region and used reusable 330 ml glass bottles distributed in digitally tracked 12-bottle "swappa" crates. The system operated without a customer deposit, with crates scanned and tracked through barcodes to monitor borrowing and returns.

The Returnables initiative was designed to reduce single-use packaging waste and lower emissions associated with glass production and recycling. Lion described the programme as a modern redevelopment of New Zealand's traditional returnable crate systems, which had historically been used in the domestic beer industry for much of the twentieth century. The company stated that the trial would be used to assess the viability of expanding reusable bottle systems nationwide.

== Ingredients ==
According to Steinlager, the Steinlager Pure beer contains malted barley, hops, yeast and water. The entire Steinlager range of beer is not gluten-free, and is not considered suitable for those with coeliac disease.

== Steinlager variants ==
=== Steinlager Blue ===
In 1991, Steinlager Blue was introduced and marketed using an advertising campaign featuring The Blues Brothers. The two different tasting beers were known as Steinlager Blue or Steinlager Green which related to the colour of the bottle or can it came in (although Steinlager Blue was sold in a brown bottle). Steinlager Blue was discontinued in the later 1990s, leaving just Steinlager Green which then dropped the green from the name. Note the only reason Steinlager Blue & Green tasted different was the bottle colour. Beers bottled in green or clear bottles degrade under UV light. Both Steinlager beers were brewed in the same vat.

=== Steinlager Premium Light ===
Introduced in 2000 as a low alcohol variant of Steinlager.

=== Steinlager Super Cold ===
Introduced in 2006, Super Cold is simply Steinlager Classic (5% ABV Pale Lager) served on tap at 0 degrees Celsius. It is featured at various New Zealand venues.

=== Steinlager Pure ===
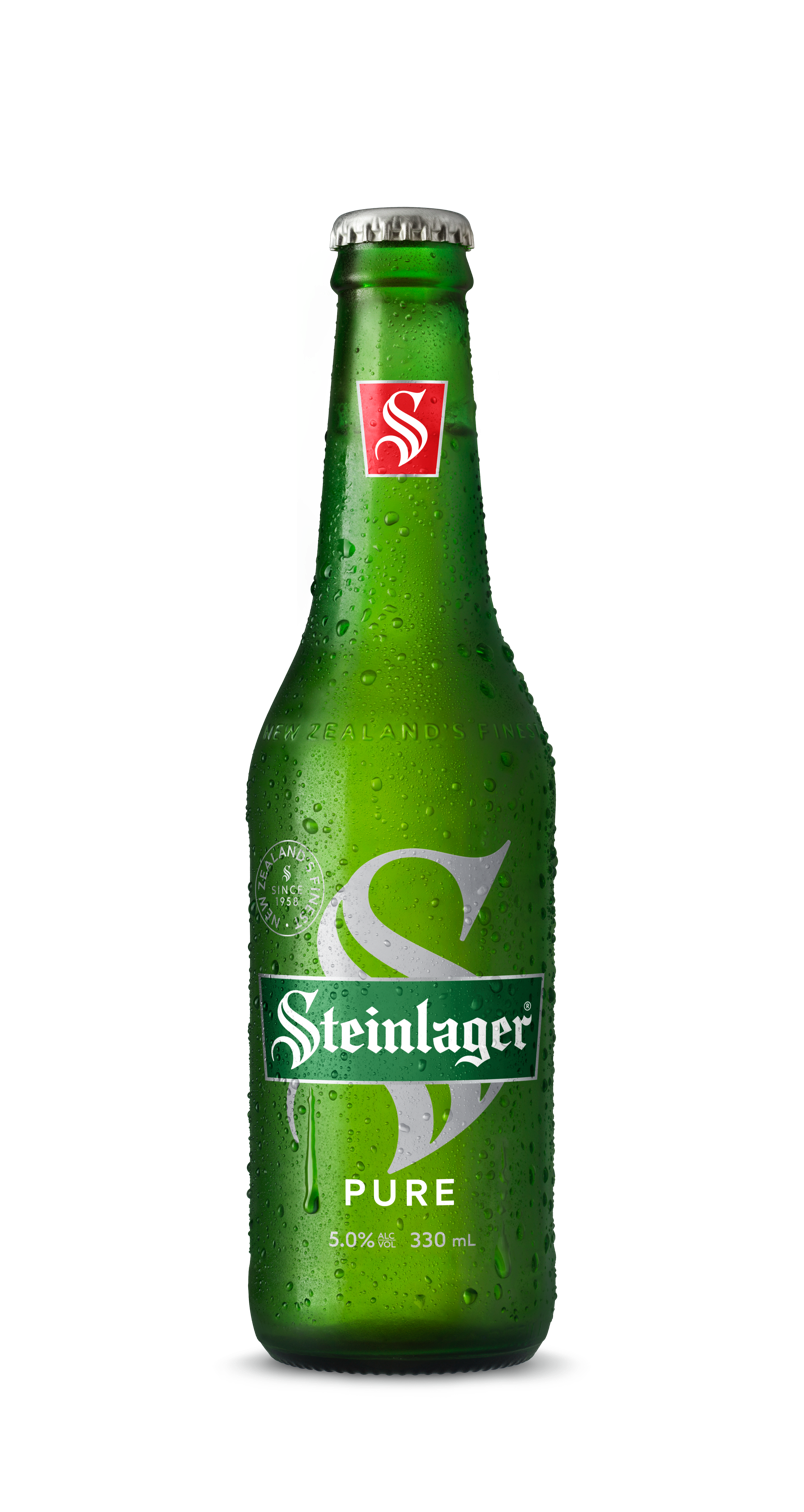
Steinlager Pure

In June 2007, Steinlager Pure was launched as a premium extension of the Steinlager brand. It was brewed using four ingredients which included water, malted barley, yeast and New Zealand-grown hops. It did not contain additives or preservatives.

Steinlager Pure incorporated several New Zealand hop varieties, including Pacific Jade, a hop developed by HortResearch and commercially introduced in partnership with Steinlager. The beer also used Nelson Sauvin hops, contributing to a lighter hop aroma and cleaner finish than Steinlager Classic.

The launch of Steinlager Pure was supported by international advertising campaigns featuring actors Harvey Harvey Keitel, Willem Dafoe and Vincent Gallo. The product was later expanded into export markets including Australia, Hawaii and the United Kingdom, and was introduced on tap in New Zealand bars in 2012.

=== Steinlager Edge ===
Steinlager Edge was a mid-strength, low-carb variant of Steinlager launched in 2009. It is made from the same hops as Classic and Pure but had an alcohol content of just 3.5% compared to 5.0%. It was discontinued in 2013 due to poor sales.

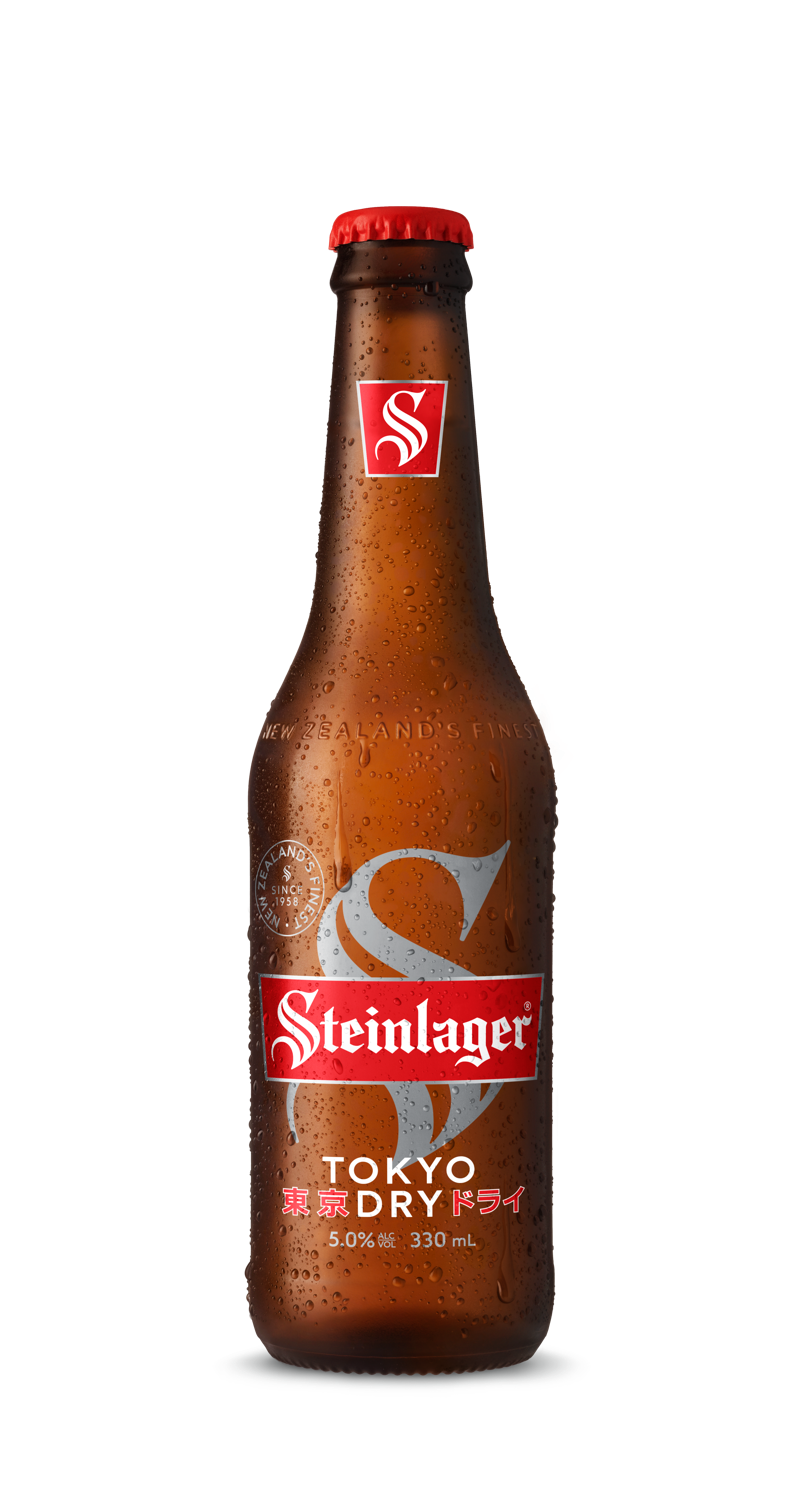
Steinlager Tokyo Dry

=== Steinlager Tokyo Dry ===
In 2016, Steinlager Tokyo Dry was introduced as "New Zealand raw ingredients meet Japanese brewing mastery".

The beer was developed through collaboration between Lion New Zealand and Lion's Japanese parent company, Kirin , incorporating brewing techniques associated with Japanese dry lagers.

Tokyo Dry was brewed using New Zealand malted barley, rice syrup and Green Bullet hops. The addition of rice syrup during brewing was intended to produce a lighter-bodied beer with a drier and crisper finish than Steinlager Classic. The beer was positioned within the growing international-style dry lager category, influenced by the popularity of Japanese brewing methods.

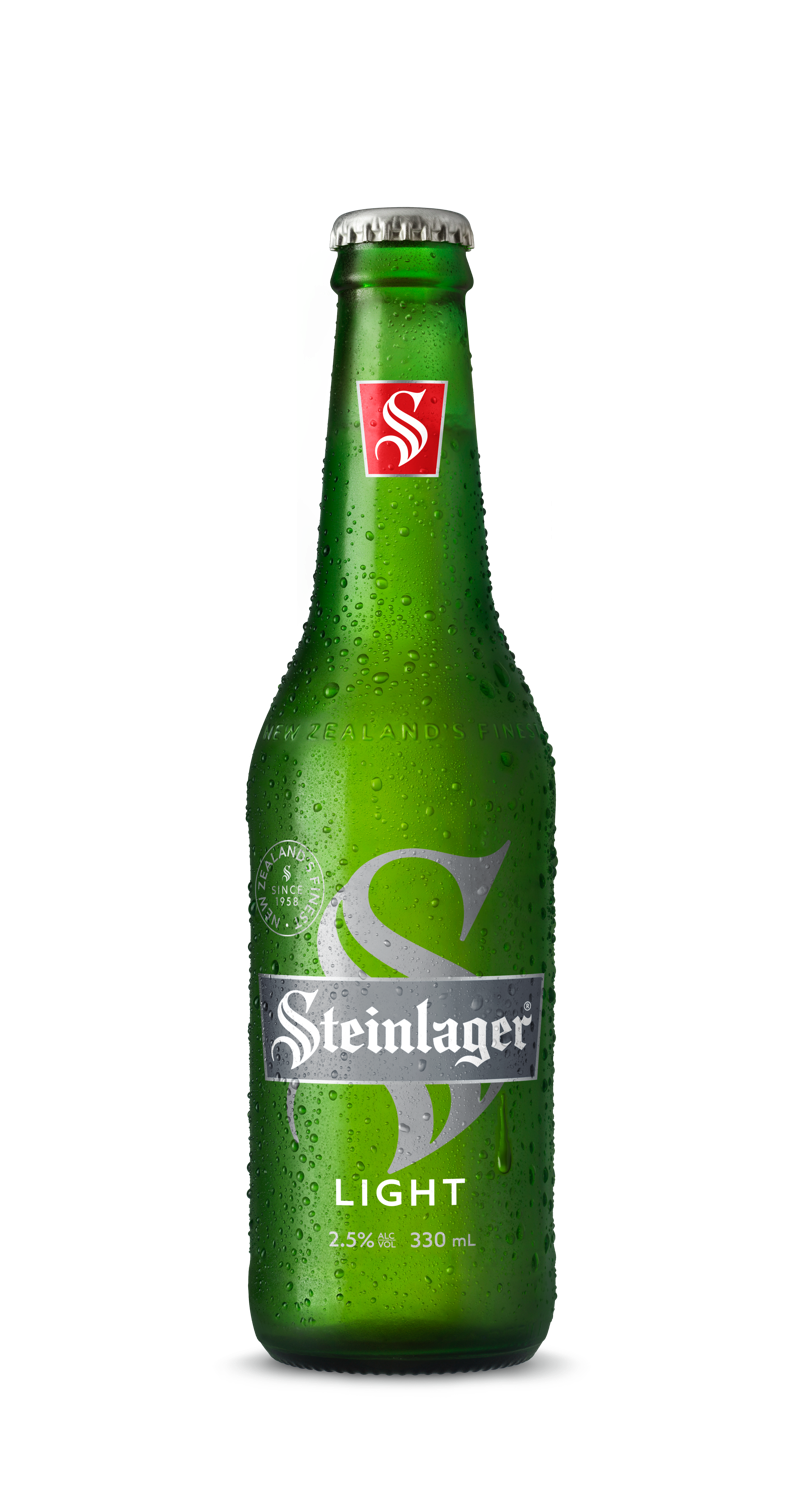
Steinlager Light

=== Steinlager Light ===
Steinlager Light is a low-alcohol lager introduced as part of the Steinlager range's expansion into lighter beer styles. The product was launched in 2019 alongside Steinlager Pure Ultra (later Steinlager Ultra Low Carb) in response to growing consumer demand for lower-alcohol and lower-carbohydrate beer options.

Brewed at 2.5% ABV, Steinlager Light was developed as a mid-point between full-strength and alcohol-free beer, while retaining the flavour profile associated with the Steinlager brand. The beer is characterised by a lighter hop aroma, lower bitterness and a crisp finish compared with Steinlager Classic.

=== Steinlager Ultra Low Carb ===
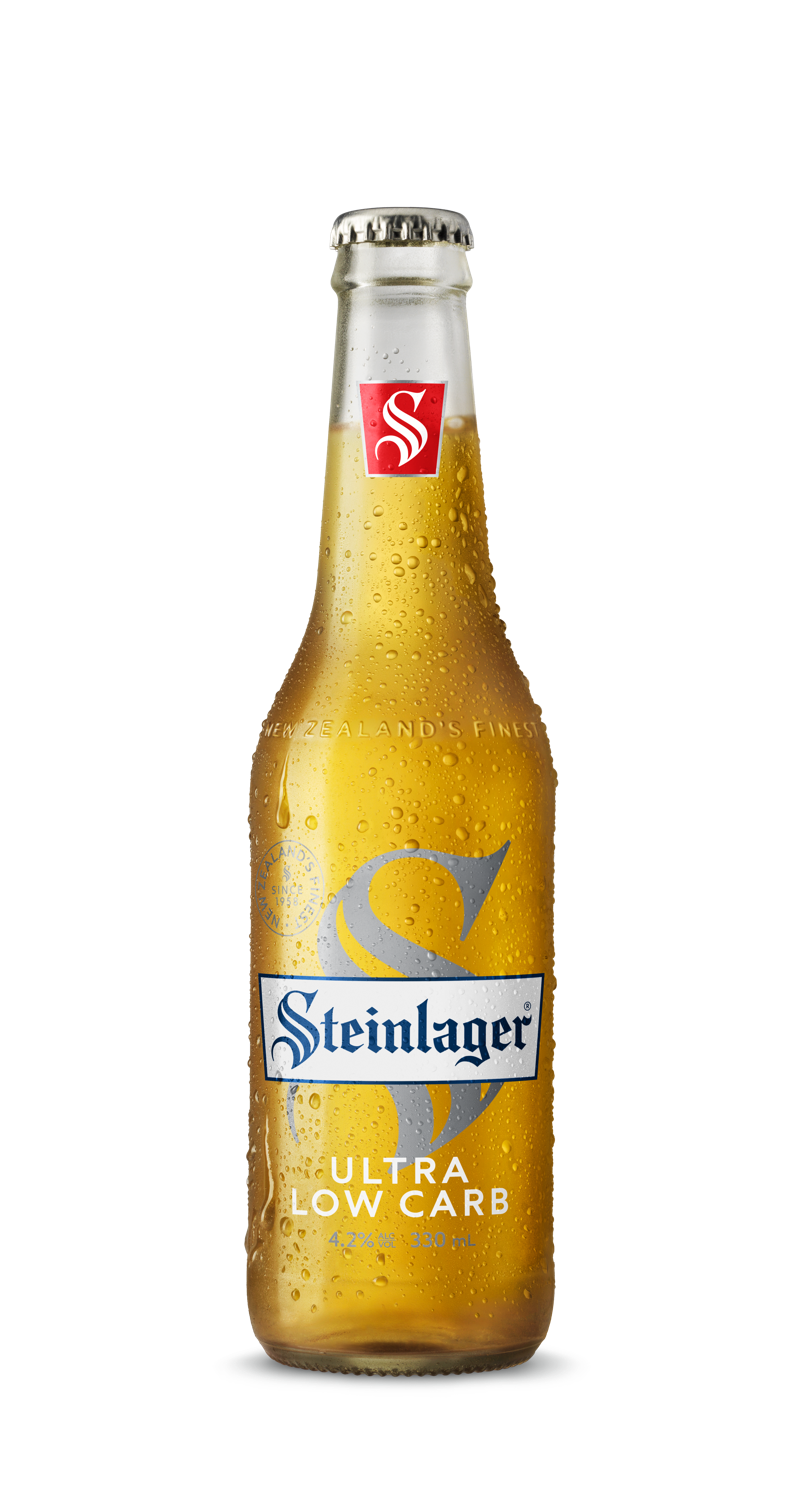
Steinlager Ultra Low Carb

Steinlager Ultra Low Carb is a reduced-carbohydrate lager introduced as part of the Steinlager range's expansion into lower-carb and lifestyle-oriented beer categories. Brewed at 4.2% ABV, the beer was developed to retain the flavour and body associated with full-strength lager while significantly reducing carbohydrate content.

The beer is brewed using New Zealand pilsner malt and Munich malt, with fermentation extended to reduce residual carbohydrates. According to Lion, the brewing process was designed to balance carbohydrate reduction with flavour retention, a technical challenge commonly associated with low-carb beer production.

Steinlager Ultra Low Carb is characterised by a lighter malt profile, moderate hop bitterness and a crisp finish compared with Steinlager Classic. The release formed part of a broader industry shift during the late 2010s and early 2020s toward lower-carbohydrate beer products in the New Zealand market.

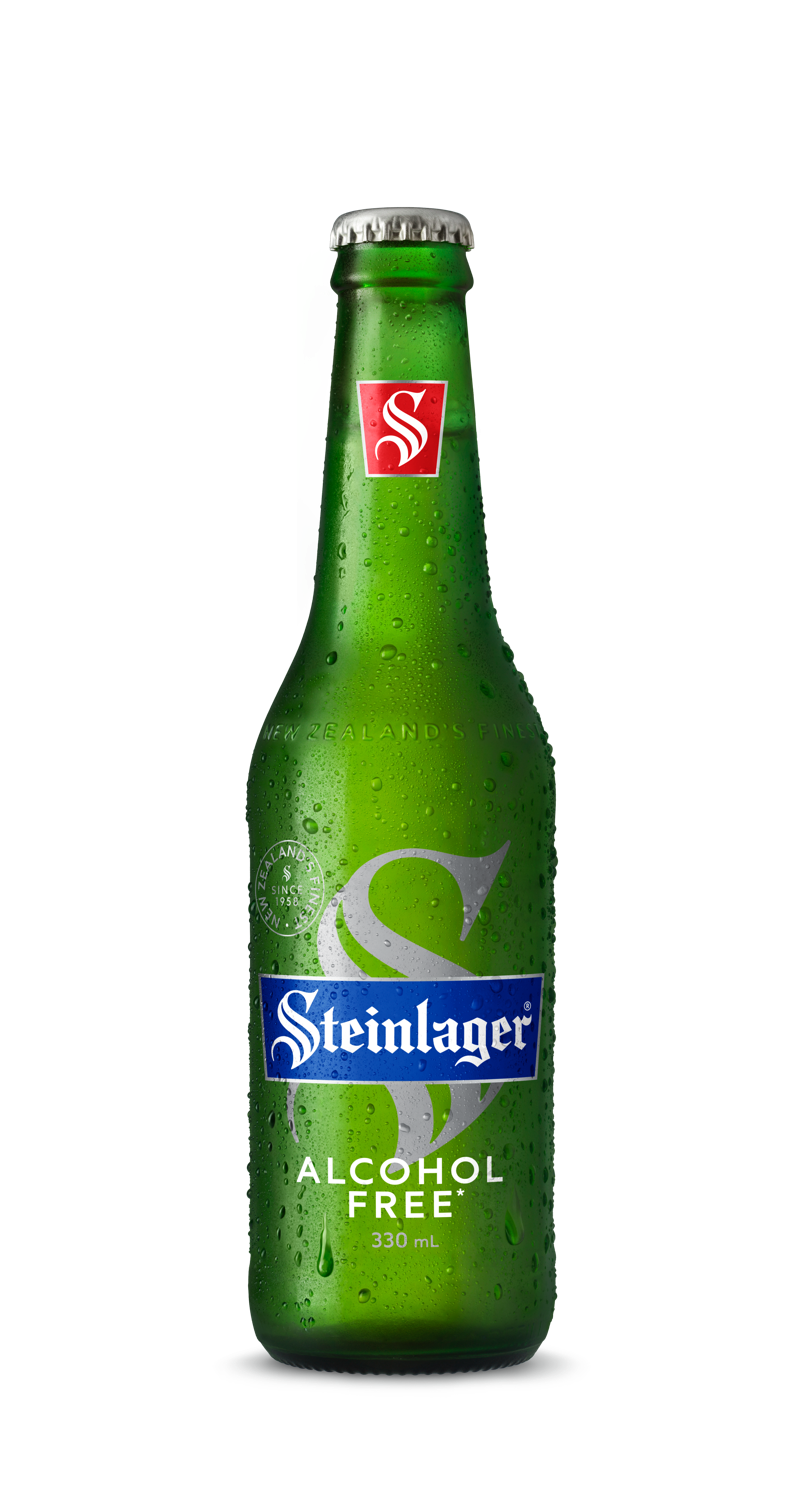
Steinlager Alcohol Free

=== Steinlager Alcohol Free ===
Steinlager Alcohol Free is a non-alcoholic lager brewed at 0.0% ABV and introduced as part of the Steinlager range's expansion into alcohol-free beer categories during the early 2020s. The beer was developed using a low-temperature fermentation process designed to minimise alcohol production during brewing rather than removing alcohol after fermentation.

According to Lion, the beer is fermented at temperatures close to 0 °C, substantially lower than the temperatures typically used in conventional lager brewing. The process was intended to preserve flavour compounds that can be reduced through dealcoholisation methods involving heat or filtration.

In March 2026, Lion issued a nationwide recall involving Steinlager Ultra Low Carb beer after a production error resulted in some 4.2% ABV Ultra Low Carb bottles being incorrectly labelled as Steinlager Alcohol Free. Approximately 2,500 cases were recalled across New Zealand following a consumer complaint.

== Awards ==
Placement	Award	Award Origins	Year	Product
Winner	"Best Beer in the World"- Les Amis du Vin Award	United States	1977	Steinlager Classic
Winner	"Best Beer in the World"- Les Amis du Vin Award	United States	1978	Steinlager Classic
Winner	"Best Beer in the World"- Les Amis du Vin Award	United States	1979	Steinlager Classic
Winner	"Best Beer in the World"- Les Amis du Vin Award	United States	1980	Steinlager Classic
Champion	Championship Trophy- Brewing Industry International Awards	Burton-on-Trent, England	1985	Steinlager Classic
Trophy	Australian International Beer Awards	Australia	2006	Steinlager Classic
Silver	Reduced ABV Lager- Australian International Beer Awards	Australia	2006	Steinlager Mid
Winner	Best Beer- M2 Best Awards	New Zealand	2007	Steinlager Pure
Bronze	Best International-Style Lager- Australian International Beer Awards	Australia	2007	Steinlager Classic
Silver	Reduced ABV Lager- Australian International Beer Awards	Australia	2007	Steinlager Mid
Bronze	Best International-Style Lager- Australian International Beer Awards	Australia	2008	Steinlager Pure
Silver	Best International-Style Lager- Australian International Beer Awards	Australia	2008	Steinlager Classic
Bronze	International-style Lager- Australian International Beer Awards	Australia	2009	Steinlager Classic
Bronze	International-style Lager- Australian International Beer Awards	Australia	2010	Steinlager Classic
Silver	International-style Lager- Australian International Beer Awards	Australia	2011	Steinlager Classic
Silver	International-style Lager- Australian International Beer Awards	Australia	2012	Steinlager Pure
Silver	International-style Lager- Australian International Beer Awards	Australia	2012	Steinlager Classic
Bronze	International-style Lager- Australian International Beer Awards	Australia	2014	Steinlager Pure
Silver	International-style Lager- Australian International Beer Awards	Australia	2015	Steinlager Pure
Bronze	International-style Lager- Australian International Beer Awards	Australia	2015	Steinlager Classic
Bronze	Premium Lager – NZ Beer Awards	New Zealand	2015	Steinlager Pure
Bronze	Session Beer – NZ Beer Awards	New Zealand	2015	Steinlager Mid
Bronze	International-style Lager- Australian International Beer Awards	Australia	2016	Steinlager Pure
Silver	Reduced ABV Lager- Australian International Beer Awards	Australia	2016	Steinlager MID
Gold	Best in Class – New World Beer & Cider Awards	New Zealand	2016	Steinlager Pure
Bronze	Session Beer – NZ Beer Awards	New Zealand	2016	Steinlager Mid
Bronze	Beer & Cider Awards Category – New World Beer & Cider Awards	New Zealand	2016	Steinlager Classic
Bronze	Beer & Cider Awards Category – New World Beer & Cider Awards	New Zealand	2016	Steinlager MID
Bronze	Australian-style Lager- Australian International Beer Awards	Australia	2017	Steinlager Pure
Bronze	Reduced ABV Lager- Australian International Beer Awards	Australia	2017	Steinlager MID
Silver	US-style Lager- Australian International Beer Awards	Australia	2017	Steinlager Tokyo Dry
Bronze	Premium Lager – NZ Beer Awards	New Zealand	2017	Steinlager Pure
Gold	Experimental – NZ Beer Awards	New Zealand	2017	Steinlager Mid
Gold	Premium Lager – NZ Beer Awards	New Zealand	2017	Steinlager Tokyo Dry
Bronze	Beer & Cider Awards Category – New World Beer & Cider Awards	New Zealand	2017	Steinlager Classic
Bronze	Beer & Cider Awards Category – New World Beer & Cider Awards	New Zealand	2017	Steinlager MID
Bronze	Beer & Cider Awards Category – New World Beer & Cider Awards	New Zealand	2017	Steinlager Tokyo Dry
Silver	Australian-style Lager- Australian International Beer Awards	Australia	2018	Steinlager Pure
Silver	Australian-style Lager- Australian International Beer Awards	Australia	2018	Steinlager Classic
Bronze	Reduced ABV Lager- Australian International Beer Awards	Australia	2018	Steinlager MID
Bronze	Premium Lager – NZ Beer Awards	New Zealand	2018	Steinlager Tokyo Dry
Bronze	Beer & Cider Awards Category – New World Beer & Cider Awards	New Zealand	2018	Steinlager MID
Silver	Beer & Cider Awards Category – New World Beer & Cider Awards	New Zealand	2018	Steinlager Pure
Trophy	Best Australian-Style Lager- Australian International Beer Awards	Australia	2019	Steinlager Pure
Gold	Reduced ABV Lager- Australian International Beer Awards	Australia	2019	Steinlager Pure Light
Bronze	Premium Lager – NZ Beer Awards	New Zealand	2019	Steinlager Pure
Bronze	Style Amber Light – NZ Beer Awards	New Zealand	2019	Steinlager Pure Ultra
Silver	Alcohol Ale or Lager – NZ Beer Awards	New Zealand	2019	Steinlager Pure Light
Bronze	Premium Lager – NZ Beer Awards	New Zealand	2019	Steinlager Classic
Bronze	Premium Lager – NZ Beer Awards	New Zealand	2019	Steinlager Tokyo Dry
Bronze	NZ Premium Lager – New Zealand Brewers Guild	New Zealand	2019	Steinlager Pure
Bronze	American-Style Amber Light Lager – New Zealand Brewers Guild	New Zealand	2019	Steinlager Ultra
Silver	Other Low Alcohol Ale or Lager – New Zealand Brewers Guild	New Zealand	2019	Steinlager Light
Bronze	NZ Premium Lager – New Zealand Brewers Guild	New Zealand	2019	Steinlager Classic
Bronze	NZ Premium Lager – New Zealand Brewers Guild	New Zealand	2019	Steinlager Tokyo Dry
Silver	Highly Commended – New World Beer & Cider Awards	New Zealand	2021	Steinlager Pure
Silver	Highly Commended – New World Beer & Cider Awards	New Zealand	2021	Steinlager Pure Light
Silver	Highly Commended – New World Beer & Cider Awards	New Zealand	2021	Steinlager Classic
Gold	Top 30 – New World Beer & Cider Awards	New Zealand	2021	Steinlager Tokyo Dry
Gold	NZ Premium Lager – New Zealand Brewers Guild	New Zealand	2021	Steinlager Pure
Gold	American-style Light Lager – New Zealand Brewers Guild	New Zealand	2021	Steinlager Ultra
Silver	Other Low Alcohol Ale or Lager – New Zealand Brewers Guild	New Zealand	2021	Steinlager Light
Silver	NZ Premium Lager – New Zealand Brewers Guild	New Zealand	2021	Steinlager Classic
Gold	NZ Premium Lager – New Zealand Brewers Guild	New Zealand	2021	Steinlager Tokyo Dry
Bronze	NZ Premium Lager – New Zealand Brewers Guild	New Zealand	2022	Steinlager Pure
Silver	American-style Light Lager – New Zealand Brewers Guild	New Zealand	2022	Steinlager Ultra
Bronze	Reduced Alcohol Ale or Lager – New Zealand Brewers Guild	New Zealand	2022	Steinlager Light
Silver	NZ Premium Lager – New Zealand Brewers Guild	New Zealand	2022	Steinlager Classic
Silver	NZ Premium Lager – New Zealand Brewers Guild	New Zealand	2022	Steinlager Tokyo Dry
Bronze	Non-Alcoholic Malt Beverage – New Zealand Brewers Guild	New Zealand	2022	Steinlager Alcohol Free
Silver	NZ Premium Lager – New Zealand Brewers Guild	New Zealand	2023	Steinlager Pure
Silver	American-Style Light Lager – New Zealand Brewers Guild	New Zealand	2023	Steinlager Ultra
Silver	Reduced Alcohol Ale or Lager – New Zealand Brewers Guild	New Zealand	2023	Steinlager Light
Silver	NZ Premium Lager – New Zealand Brewers Guild	New Zealand	2023	Steinlager Classic
Silver	NZ Premium Lager – New Zealand Brewers Guild	New Zealand	2023	Steinlager Tokyo Dry
Silver	Non-alcoholic Malt Beverage – New Zealand Brewers Guild	New Zealand	2023	Steinlager Alcohol Free
Bronze	NZ Premium Lager – New Zealand Brewers Guild	New Zealand	2024	Steinlager Pure
Bronze	American-Style Light Lager – New Zealand Brewers Guild	New Zealand	2024	Steinlager Ultra
Silver	Reduced Alcohol Ale or Lager – New Zealand Brewers Guild	New Zealand	2024	Steinlager Light
Bronze	NZ Premium Lager – New Zealand Brewers Guild	New Zealand	2024	Steinlager Classic
Gold	NZ Premium Lager – New Zealand Brewers Guild	New Zealand	2024	Steinlager Tokyo Dry
Bronze	Reduced Alcohol Ale or Lager – New Zealand Brewers Guild	New Zealand	2024	Steinlager Alcohol Free
Gold	NZ Premium Lager – New Zealand Brewers Guild	New Zealand	2025	Steinlager Pure
Gold	American-Style Light Lager – New Zealand Brewers Guild	New Zealand	2025	Steinlager Ultra
Silver	Reduced Alcohol Ale or Lager – New Zealand Brewers Guild	New Zealand	2025	Steinlager Light
Gold	NZ Premium Lager – New Zealand Brewers Guild	New Zealand	2025	Steinlager Classic
Silver	NZ Premium Lager – New Zealand Brewers Guild	New Zealand	2025	Steinlager Tokyo Dry
Silver	Non-Alcoholic Malt Beverage – New Zealand Brewers Guild	New Zealand	2025	Steinlager Alcohol Free
