= Markham Vineyards =

- Location: St. Helena, California, USA
- Formerly: Laurent Winery
- Founded: 1978
- Key people: Kimberlee Nicholls, Winemaker
- Parent company: Distinguished Vineyards and Wine Partners
- Known for: Napa Valley Merlot
- Varietals: Cabernet Sauvignon, Merlot, Zinfandel, Pinot noir, Syrah, Petite Sirah, Cabernet Franc, Cabernet Sauvignon, Sauvignon Blanc, Chardonnay
- Distribution: national
- Tasting: open to the public
- Website: http://www.markhamvineyards.com

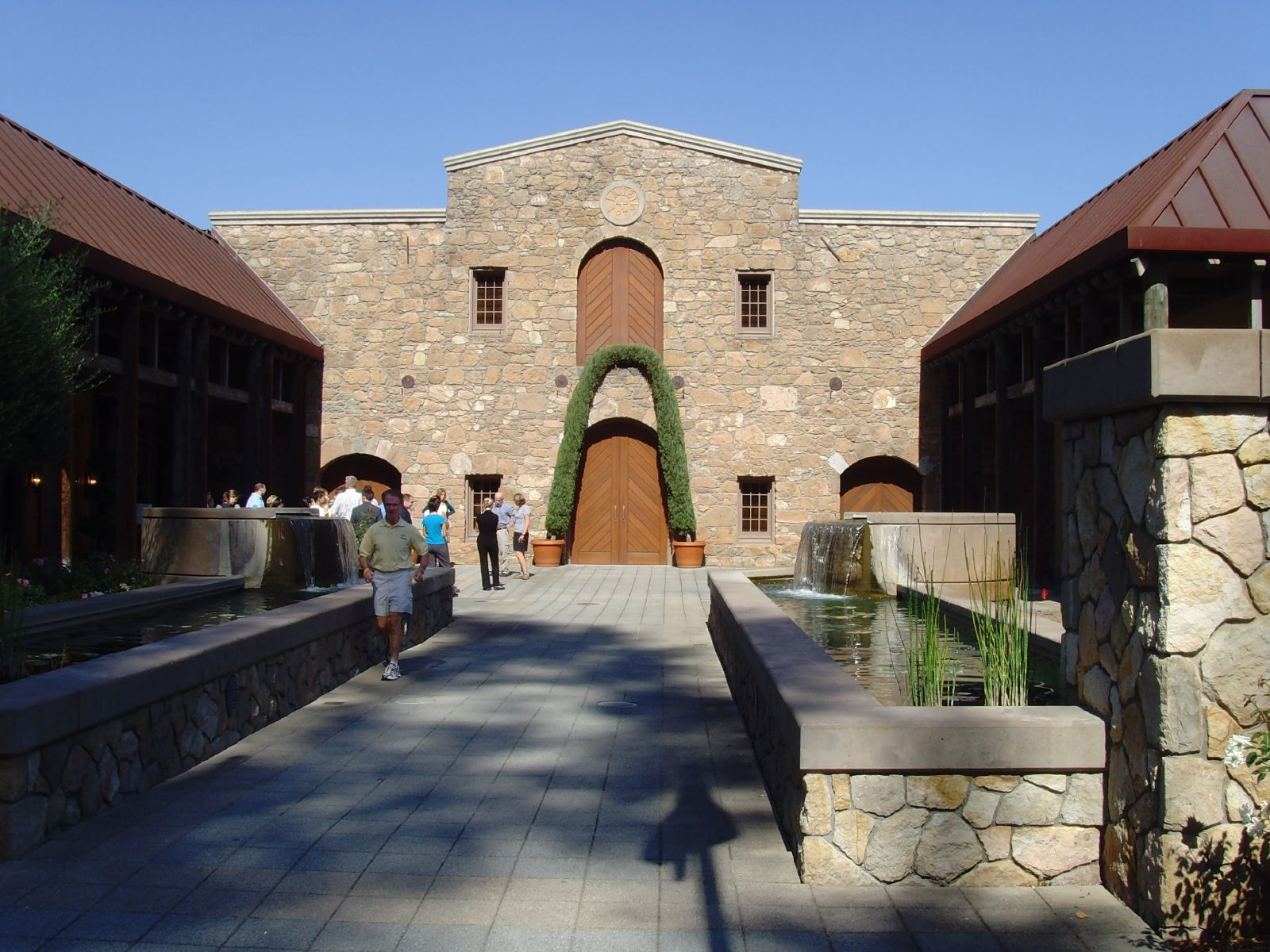
Markham Vineyards

Markham Vineyards is a US winery founded in Napa Valley, California, in 1874. Markham has operated continuously since its founding (though under different names), making it the fourth oldest continuously operating winery in Napa County.

As of 2020 it is owned by Distinguished Vineyards & Wine Partners, which is ultimately owned by Japanese company Kirin.

== History ==
Markham Vineyards was founded by Jean Laurent, an immigrant from the Bordeaux region of France, who arrived in California in 1852 as part of the population influx that resulted from the California Gold Rush. Recognizing that suitability of the Napa Valley land for winemaking, he founded his winemaking operation in 1874.

Jean Laurent died in 1890, after which his winery continued to operate successfully under a succession of owners. In the late 1930s it was the location of St. Helena Cooperative Winery, known as the "little co-op" at the time. In 1975, vintner Bruce Markham purchased Yountville Vineyard, Calistoga Vineyard in 1976, and the old Laurent Winery in 1977 and founded Markham Vineyards. His first wine, a Cabernet Sauvignon, was produced in 1978.

In 1988, the former Laurent Winery was sold to Japanese wine and spirits producer Mercian Corporation, who commenced a four-year, multimillion-dollar renovation, expansion and vineyard replanting program on the Markham properties. These efforts more than doubled the capacity of Markham Vineyards.

Since 2019 it has been owned by Distinguished Vineyards & Wine Partners, which is ultimately owned by Japanese company Kirin.

== Production ==
Markham's Napa Valley properties encompass 260 acres of sustainably farmed vineyards in the areas bordering Mt. St. Helena, around the Calistoga, Yountville and Oak Knoll communities. Markham Vineyards produces wines in the Merlot, Cabernet Sauvignon, Sauvignon blanc and Chardonnay families. It has historically been known for its Cabernet Sauvignon, though its Merlot, introduced in 1980, has subsequently become the brand's flagship varietal.

== The Markham Mark of Distinction Grant Initiative ==
In 2008, Markham Vineyards created the Mark of Distinction, a charitable effort that awards two $25,000 grants per year to organizations or individuals that work to cultivate positive change in American communities. To complement the grant program, Markham annually produces two single-vineyard, limited production Estate Cabernet Sauvignon wines – The Philanthropist and The Altruist – in honor of the grant recipients. These wines feature labels that highlight each grant recipient's work.

Recent Mark of Distinction Grant recipients have included Long Island Sled Hockey, a sled hockey program for physically and mentally handicapped athletes; the Paul Ruby Foundation for Parkinson's Research in Geneva, Illinois; and the Bartlett Arboretum in Belle Plaine, Kansas.
