= Jolly Shandy =

Malaysian soft drink brand

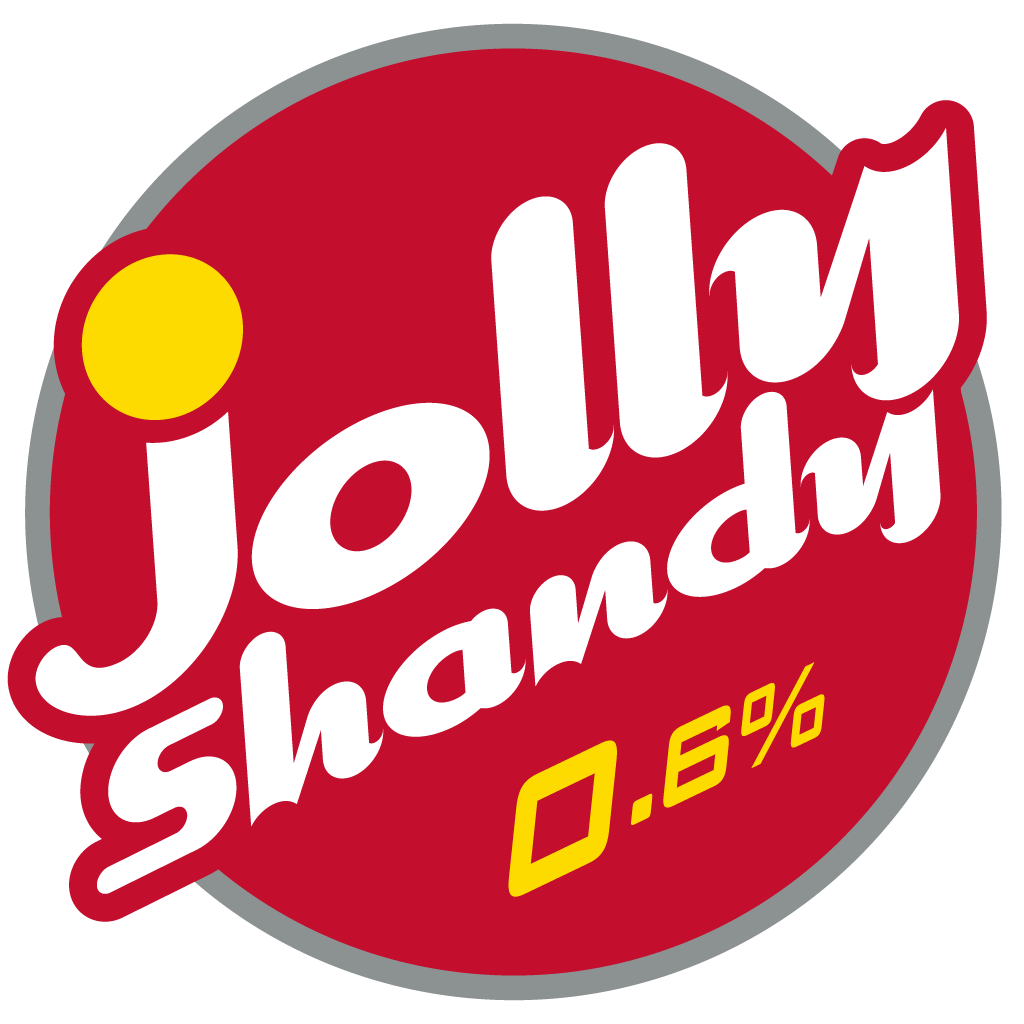
- Jolly Shandy Logo
- Type: Shandy
- Manufacturer: Carlsberg
- Introduced: 1986
- Website: carlsberggroup.com/brands/Pages/JollyShandy.aspx

Jolly Shandy is a type of soft drink produced by Carlsberg in South-East Asia. Its composition is mixed with lemonade and beer containing under 1% Alcohol by volume (ABV).

== History ==
The first Jolly Shandy in Hong Kong was introduced in 1986. It is now mostly available in supermarkets, convenience stores, western restaurants and Chinese restaurants.

The apple flavor Jolly Shandy and the grapefruit flavor Jolly Shandy were again introduced in 1999 and 2001 respectively. The company of re-launched its beverage brand in 2007. The lemon taste was improved and Vitamin C was added to it.

A new version of the beer mix called Jolly Shandy Lychee was introduced to the customers who were not satisfied with the original taste of Jolly Shandy. The packing size of the Lychee flavored Jolly Shandy is 330 mL and contains 0.6% alcohol content. Jolly Shandy is produced in Malaysia and mainland China.

== Ingredients ==
In Hong Kong, there are currently four flavors of Jolly Shandy: lychee, golden kiwi, lemon, and ginger. Other flavors like apple, peach, and pineapple have been discontinued. Some special flavors of Jolly Shandy such as Mandarin orange flavor are sold in Malaysia and Singapore.

Jolly Shandy is a brand of energetic beverage under the banner of Carlsberg. The ingredients of Jolly Shandy include water, sugar, beer, barley malt, carbonating agent (carbon dioxide), acidity regulator (citric acid), flavoring, Caramel color (E150c), Hops, and antioxidant (E300).

A typical can of Jolly Shandy (330mL with 0.6% alcohol) contains 7.5 grams per 100 mL of sugar, 0 mg of sodium, 0 grams fat, and 36 kilocalories per 100mL.

== Design ==
Jolly Shandy’s package design has been changed several times since its launch. Its appearance also differs in different regions.

=== 1986 to 1990s ===
In the 1990s, Jolly Shandy appeared with a two color design, separating the upper and lower parts. Golden “Jolly” and silvery “Shandy” labels were put in the middle part of the can. The three different flavors had their own specific colors. Before being changed to the current design, Jolly Shandy was on sale with a black coating, while there was a lightning sign in the respective colors of the different flavors as decoration. The color of the word “Jolly Shandy” was also changed to silver. In 2013, the design of Jolly Shandy was reworked by a design team led by Alfonso Granati. The two new color designs with bright colors are used to represent a youngster-focused strategy. In the new design, the dot of letter J in the label “Jolly” has been changed to yellow.

=== From 2002 ===
The new package design in 2002 is different from the original design in 1986, the new label design has a concentric circles in the background.

== See also ==
- Carlsberg Group
- Shandy
- Beer in Hong Kong
