= Blue Girl Beer =

German beer brand

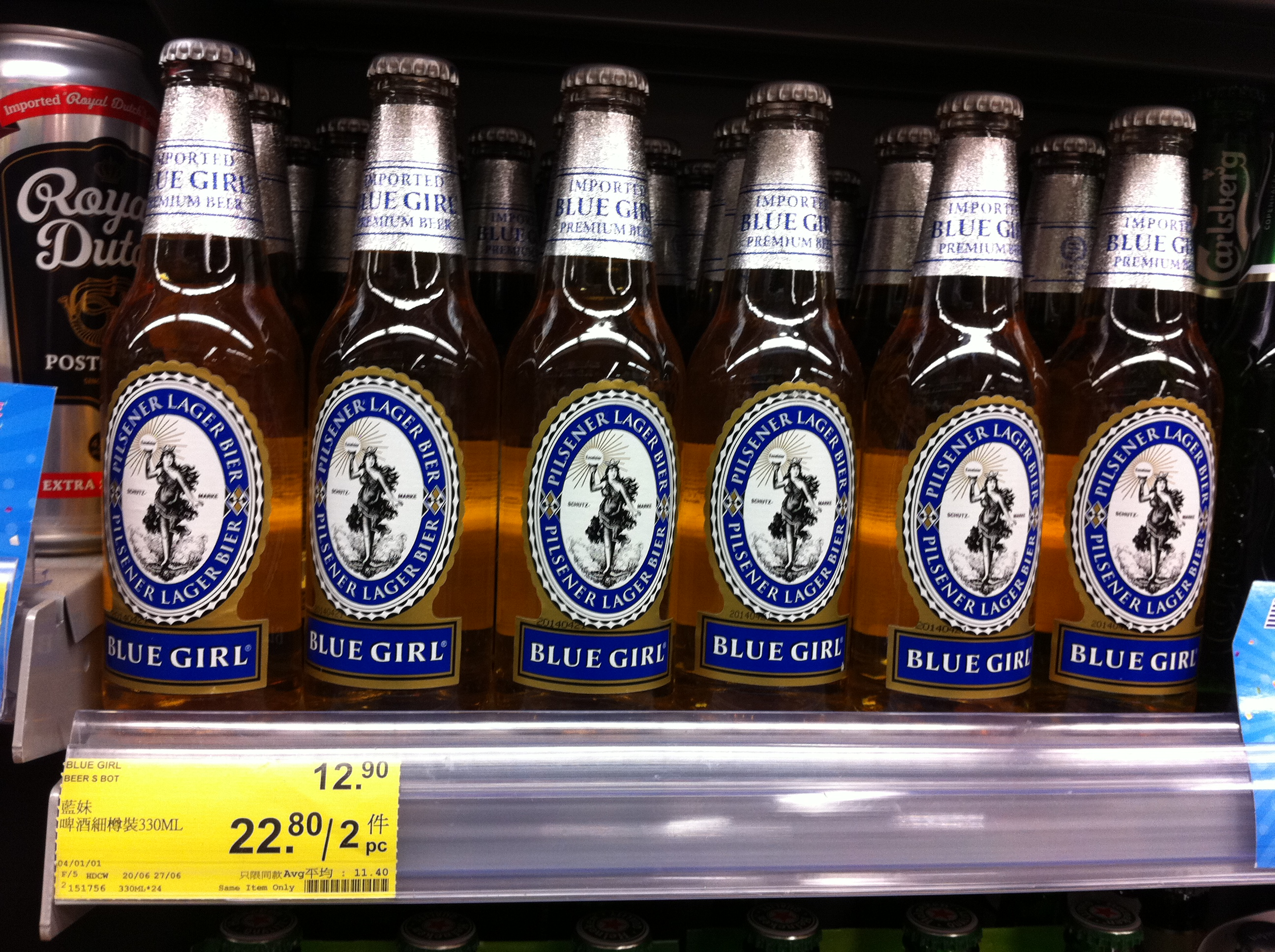
Blue Girl Beer

Blue Girl Beer (Chinese: 藍妹啤酒) is a beer brand founded in the 19th century. It is currently brewed in South Korea.

== History ==
Blue Girl Beer was first brewed in Bremen in the 19th century. In 1906, Blue Girl Beer was acquired by Jebsen & Co. and was introduced into Hong Kong. Nowadays, it is one of the most popular beers in Hong Kong with a market share of 20% in Hong Kong's beer industry.

Blue Girl in September, 2012 produced around 22.4% of the entire Hong Kong beer market.

== Ingredients ==
The main ingredients of Blue Girl Beer are water, malt, hops, yeast and adjuncts.

== See also ==
- Beer in Hong Kong
