= Speight's =

Brewery in Dunedin, New Zealand

Coordinates: 45.876374°S 170.499959°E

- Type: Private
- Industry: Beverages
- Founded: 1876
- Founders: James Speight, Charles Greenslade, William Dawson
- Headquarters: Dunedin, New Zealand
- Products: Lagers and ales
- Parent: Lion (a subsidiary of Kirin)
- Website: www.speights.co.nz

Speight's is a beer brand and a brewery located in Dunedin, New Zealand. The brand is owned by the Japanese-controlled holding company Lion, itself a subsidiary of Kirin. Speight's is best known for its Gold Medal Ale, one of the best-selling beers in New Zealand. The brewery also includes a chain of "Speight's Ale House" gastropubs across the country.

== History ==
The brewery was established on Rattray Street, Central Dunedin in 1876 by James Speight, Charles Greenslade and William Dawson after they had left their positions at Wellpark Brewery (known today as the Tennent Caledonian). In 1880, Speight's won a gold medal at the Melbourne International Exhibition, giving rise to the Speight's Gold Medal Ale brand. By 1887 it had become the largest brewery in New Zealand, and had expanded to a sufficient size that it exported beer to Australia and the Pacific Islands. In 1923, Speight's merged with nine other breweries to form New Zealand Breweries—in the same year, founder William Dawson died. In 1960, New Zealand Breweries rebranded to Lucky Beer in an attempt to simplify the range, however this change lasted only two months before the Speight's brand name was re-established in October of that year. In 1977, New Zealand Breweries was purchased by Lion. In 2001, production expanded to the Lion brewery in Newmarket, Auckland. In 2026, Speight’s marked its 150th anniversary with a promotional competition in which 150 gold-coloured cans were distributed across its Summit Ultra and Gold Medal Ale ranges. Participants who found a qualifying can could enter a draw for a $150,000 NZD prize by submitting the can’s unique code through the promotion’s website. Speight's is one of the longest running commercial beer brands in New Zealand.

== Brands ==
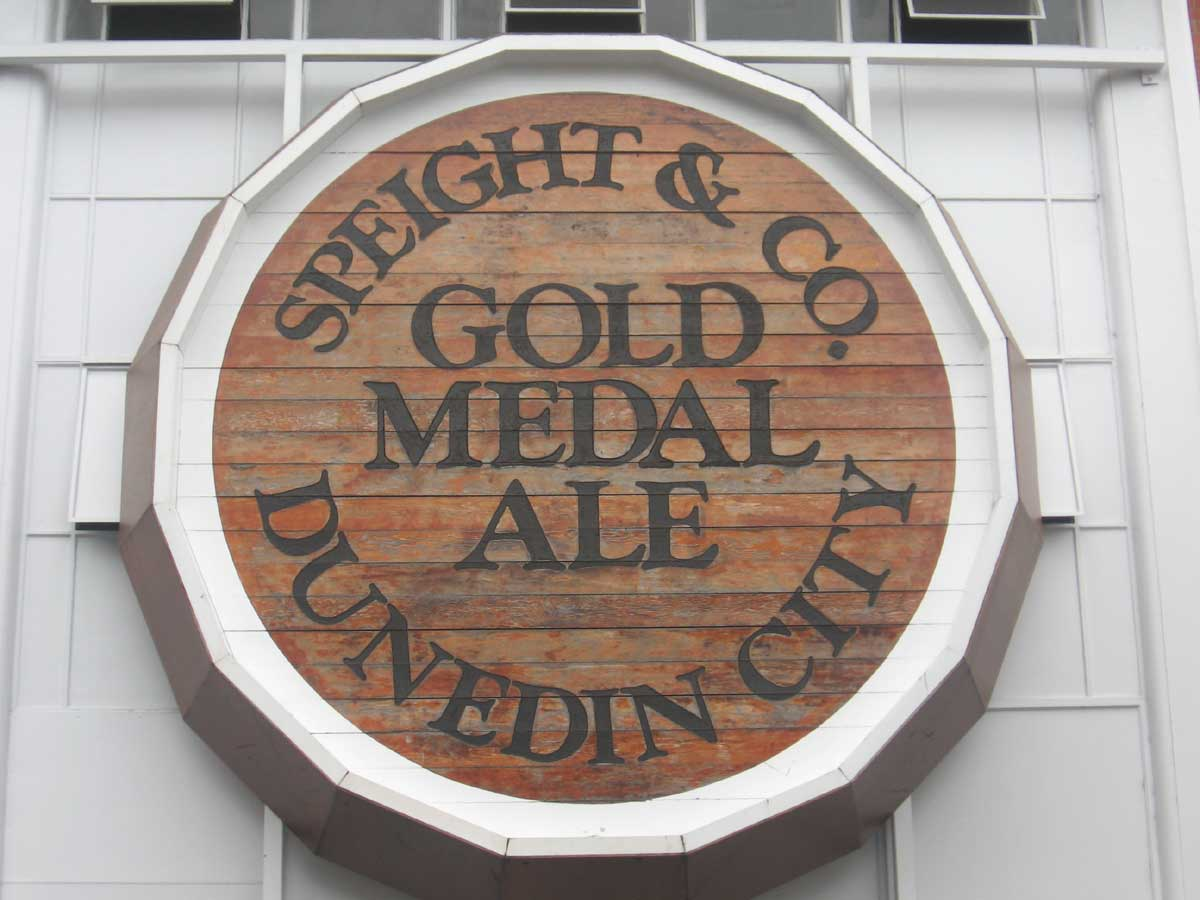
Sign at the Speight's Brewery in Dunedin

Speight's Gold Medal Ale is the brewery's best known beer. Though marketed as an ale, as it was in the past, it is actually a New Zealand Draught-style lager, brewed using lager yeast and lagering techniques.

In addition to its main Gold Medal Ale brand, Speight's also produces beers under the Speight's Summit and the Speight's Craft ranges of beer, the latter including the Speight's Old Dark, Speight's Distinction Ale, and Speight's Triple Hop Pilsner, all of which are lagers of varying colour.

Speight's range of beer is not gluten-free.

Speight's also produces an apple cider.

== The Speight's Building ==
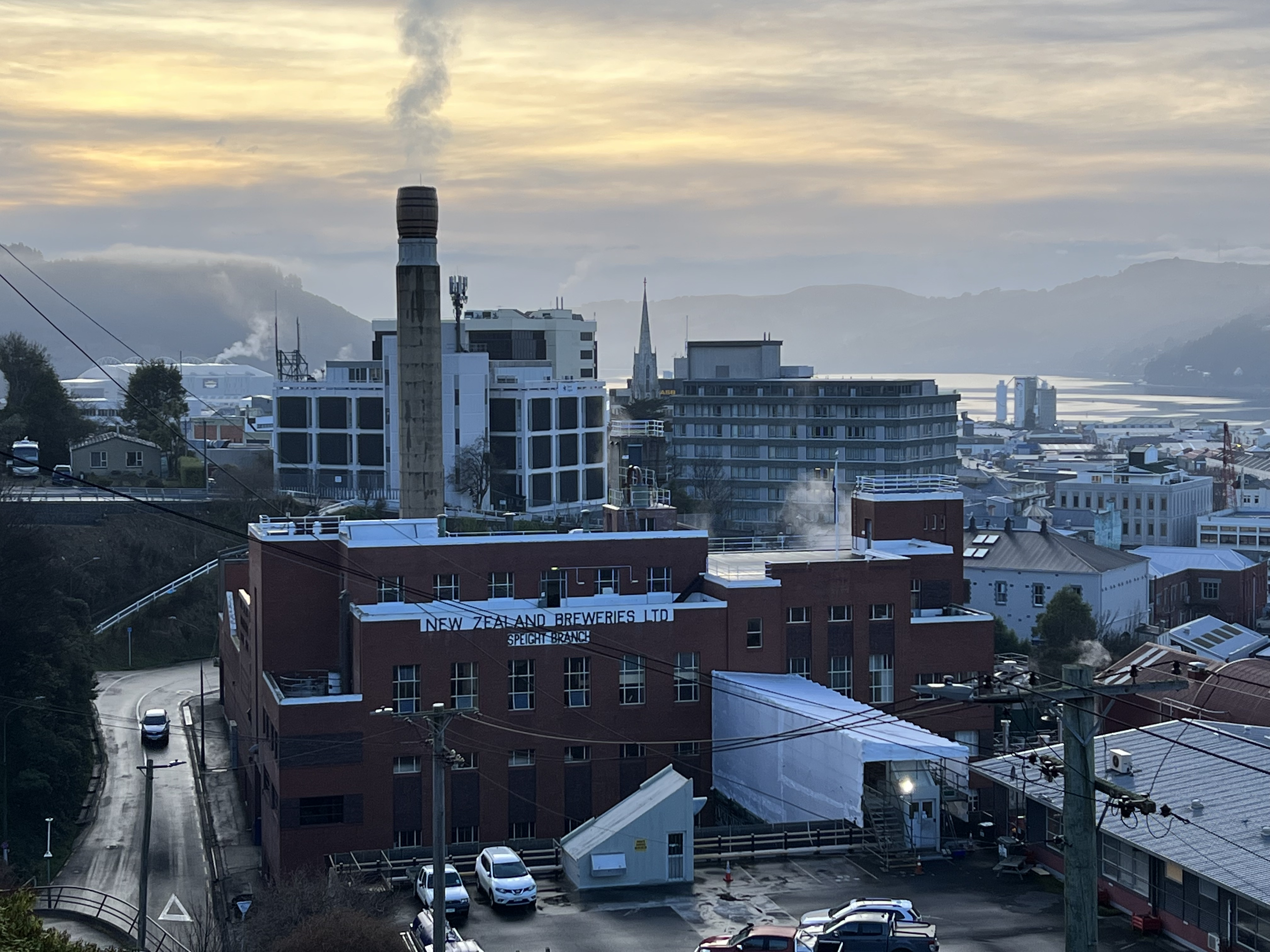
Part of the Speight's buildings in Dunedin showing the distinctive beer barrel atop the chimney.

The Speight's brewery building is a prominent landmark in Central Dunedin, located just to the west of The Exchange at the corner of Rattray and Maclaggan Streets and extending up the hill into City Rise.

The earliest parts of the building date back to its first inception in 1876, with several major extensions and renovations in the years since, most notably extensions in 1938 designed by Harry Mandeno. The most recent renovation was to provide earthquake strengthening in 2012–14.

Regular guided tours of the building are run by the company for members of the public.

== Marketing ==
Speight's label features three eight-pointed stars. These stars come from both the original provincial arms of Otago, and the fact that Speight's was awarded gold medals at brewery awards in three different countries in 1877.

More recently, Speight's Southern man advertising campaign has been popular and long running. Speight's main marketing slogan, "Pride of the South", has been used in association with these advertisements for a number of years. One popular advertisement featured the Cardrona Hotel pub. Speight's later built a loose replica of this building in Mt Eden, Auckland, as part of its national marketing scheme.

At the site of their Dunedin plant the company has installed a tap that pumps water up from a spring deep below the brewery, thus providing fresh, pure water free of charge. This tap was at the centre of an April Fool's joke in 1998 when the Otago Daily Times reported that, just for that day, Speight's beer would flow, free of charge, from that tap.

== Sponsorship ==
Speight's has a long-standing relationship with rugby union in the Otago and Southland regions. In 1977, the brewery began sponsoring the Dunedin club championship. The brewery currently has sponsorship arrangements with the Otago Highlanders, Otago Rugby Football Union, and Southland Rugby Football Union.
