= Jebsen Group =

Company headquartered in Hong Kong

Jebsen Group 捷成集團
- Type: Private Limited Company
- Industry: Motors, Beverage, Consumer, JCAP
- Founded: 1895
- Headquarters: 21/F Hysan Place, 500 Hennessy Road, Causeway Bay, Hong Kong
- Area served: Hong Kong, mainland China, Macau
- Key people: Hans Michael Jebsen
- Revenue: ▲1.5 billion USD (2025)
- Number of employees: 1,877 (2025)
- Website: www.jebsen.com

Jebsen Group (Chinese: 捷成集團, or 捷成洋行有限公司) is a marketing, investment, and distribution organisation founded in 1895. It is headquartered in Hong Kong with offices in mainland China and Macau. It consists of four business lines: Beverage, Consumer, Motors, and JCAP (Previously Jebsen Capital). It offers market access for over 200 leading companies to build their brands and market share in Greater China.

Hans Michael Jebsen is the chairman of the group, with Alfons Mensdorff-Pouilly as the CEO.

== History ==
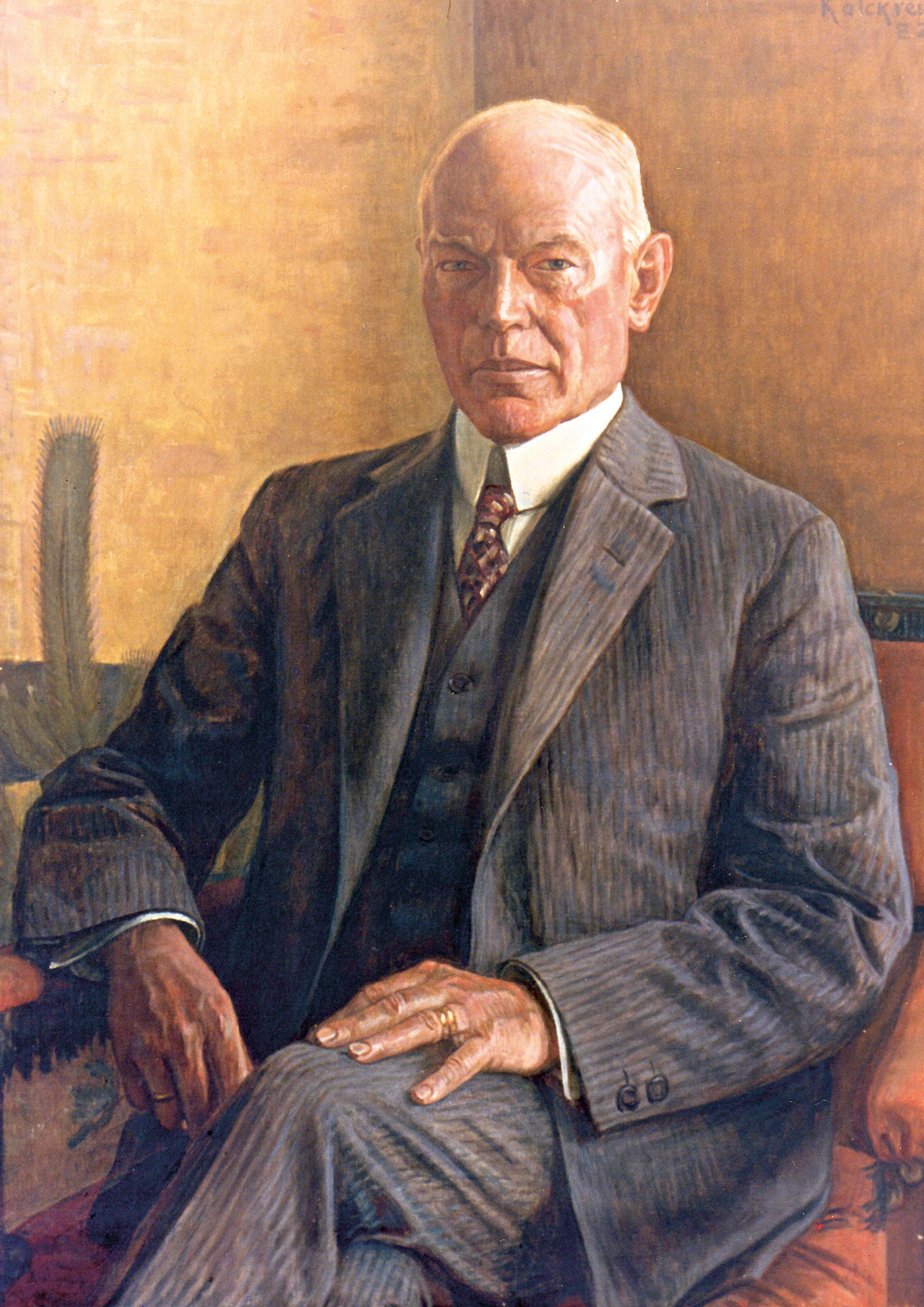
Heinrich Jessen (1865–1931)

Jebsen & Co. was established in Hong Kong in March 1895 by second-grade cousins Jacob Jebsen and Heinrich Jessen from Aabenraa. The company started as a shipping agency owned by Jebsen's father, who had a fleet of fourteen coastal steamers on the Chinese coasts. With expanding business range, in January 1909 Jebsen & Jessen Hamburg was founded to coordinate the European business. In December 1963, Jebsen & Jessen Group was founded by Arwed Peter Jessen to concentrate on business in South-East Asia.

=== Milestones ===
- 1896: Jebsen becomes a member of the Hong Kong General Chamber of Commerce
- 1897: Initial venture into the industrial sector, acquiring a BASF agency to import indigo dyes to China
- 1898: Establishment of Diederichsen, Jebsen & Co., Jebsen's first joint venture in China; its businesses include a Qingdao brick factory
- 1906: Acquisition of Blue Girl Beer
- 1941: Co-founder Jacob Jebsen died in Aabenraa at the age of 71. His eldest son took over the reins and Heinz Jessen and Michael Jebsen signed a new partnership agreement in Shanghai in January 1944.
- 1953: The import of Hong Kong's first Volkswagen Beetle
- 1955: The import of the territory's first Porsche, covering sole Porsche Car distribution in Hong Kong and Macao with additional seven dealerships in mainland China.
- 1957: Attending the inaugural Canton Fair
- 1970: Collaboration with Siemens on a 10,000-line, computer-controlled public telephone system at Lai Chi Kok's Telephone Exchange
- 1973: Modern Terminals Limited officially opens Hong Kong's first container terminal in Kwai Chung
- 1978–1979: The first liaison office opens in Beijing
- 1991: Jebsen Fine Wines is established in Hong Kong
- 2001: The import of mainland China's first Porsche
- 2013: Multi-brand lifestyle retailer J SELECT launches
- 2017: New business line Jebsen Capital launches
- 2018: Opens New Plant in Dalian, together with Austrian partner TCG Unitech
- 2019: Jebsen Beverage forms a Blue Girl Beer joint venture with AB InBev in mainland China
- 2024: Jebsen established a joint venture with The Vita Coco Company and became the sole distributor of Vita Coco products in mainland China.
- 2025: Jebsen Motors became the exclusive distributor of AITO vehicles in Macau.
- 2026: Jebsen Capital is officially renamed as JCAP.

== Corporate structure ==
=== Jebsen Motors ===
Jebsen Motors has represented Porsche in Hong Kong since 1955 and in mainland China since 2001. Globally, it is one of the longest-serving and largest Porsche dealer groups.

As Porsche China's Dealer of the Year for the ninth consecutive year in 2023, Jebsen Motors delivered more than 11,000 cars to mainland China, Macau and Hong Kong in 2023, representing approximately 12 percent of Porsche's total regional sales during this period.

=== Jebsen Beverage ===
Jebsen’s portfolio spans beer, wines and spirits, and wellness beverages. As the largest beer company in Hong Kong, Jebsen Beverage has been selling Blue Girl Beer since 1906, making it one of the most historic imports in the market. In 2019, Jebsen Beverage formed a joint venture in mainland China with the world's largest beer brewer AB InBev to accelerate Blue Girl Beer's growth in the Mainland market.

=== Jebsen Consumer ===
Over the four decades, Jebsen's focus on the consumer business has been on small domestic electrical appliances, and has since expanded its portfolio to a diverse range of lifestyle categories including electronics, watches and pet care products. The division distributes numerous well-known brands, such as Casio, G-Shock and Q-PETs.

=== JCAP (Formerly Jebsen Capital) ===
Founded in 2017 as Jebsen Group‘s modern multi-asset investment platform, JCAP invests across public and private markets, asset classes, and geographies.

== Group logo ==
The Jebsen Group's logo, established in the founding year of 1895, shows, surrounded by a laurel wreath, three mackerels on top of each other, with the top and bottom ones directing to the left side and the middle one to the right. The logo is related to the heraldic shield of the founders’ hometown in Aabenraa, which belonged to Germany in 1895 but was handed over to Denmark in 1920.
