= McCashin's Brewery =

Brewery in Nelson, New Zealand

- Company type: Private
- Industry: Beverages
- Founded: 1981
- Headquarters: Nelson, New Zealand
- Key people: Terry McCashin
- Products: Beer, wine, cider, spirits
- Website: www.mccashins.co.nz

McCashin's Brewery, also previously known as Mac's Brewery, is a small brewery based in Nelson, New Zealand. It was founded in 1980/81 by one of the pioneers of craft brewing, Terry McCashin, who produced the well-known Mac's beer. Today it produces Rochdale Cider and a range of Stoke beers.

== History ==
The property on Main Road Stoke in the Nelson suburb of Stoke started life as the Rochdale Cider factory in the late 1930s. The production facility was located in the rear section of the current building. In the 1930s and 1940s there were around five cider producers in the area, including one just across the road, Robinson’s, but by the 1970s, Rochdale was the only large commercial producer in New Zealand. The current building was erected in the 1950s.

The business was purchased in 1980 by former All Black rugby player and farmer Terry McCashin and his wife Beverley, who continued to make Rochdale Cider but also began brewing craft beer for the first time in New Zealand, with the help of brewer Jim Pollitt. Mac's beer was launched on 26 September 1981, with then Prime Minister of New Zealand, Robert Muldoon, in attendance. The small brewery (sometimes referred to as Mac's brewery) had to compete with the two giants in the market, Lion Nathan and Dominion Breweries, and McCashin is today regarded as a pioneer of craft beer.

In 1999 Lion bought the Mac's brand, and in 2000 began leasing the Mac's premises. As the popularity of the brand grew, Lion started producing Mac’s beers in Wellington, then Christchurch and, after the 2011 Christchurch earthquakes, in Auckland. Lion established a number of "Mac's Brewbars" around New Zealand.

In 2009, McCashin's son Dean McCashin and his wife Emma moved to Nelson, relaunching the brewery under its original name, McCashin's Brewery, producing beer under the newly-created Stoke brand and resuming the production of Rochdale-branded cider.

In December 2022, Scott McCashin acquired the brewery from his siblings and is a director and shareholder of the company. McCashin is the managing director. The company's executive chair is Christopher Swasbrook.

== Description ==
A range of different styles of beer is produced using traditional methods, organic hops and specially cultured yeast, including IPA, dark ale and pilsner. The non-alcoholic range consists of Stoke Lemon Lime and Bitters and Ginger Beer, and still and sparkling water, branded "Palaeo", sourced from a source underneath the brewery, is also bottled and sold.

There is also a restaurant called the Brewery Kitchen, which also provides off-site catering.

== See also ==
- List of food companies
