= Little Creatures Brewery =

Western Australian beer brewery

Coordinates: 32.0593°S 115.7446°E

Little Creatures Brewing Pty Ltd

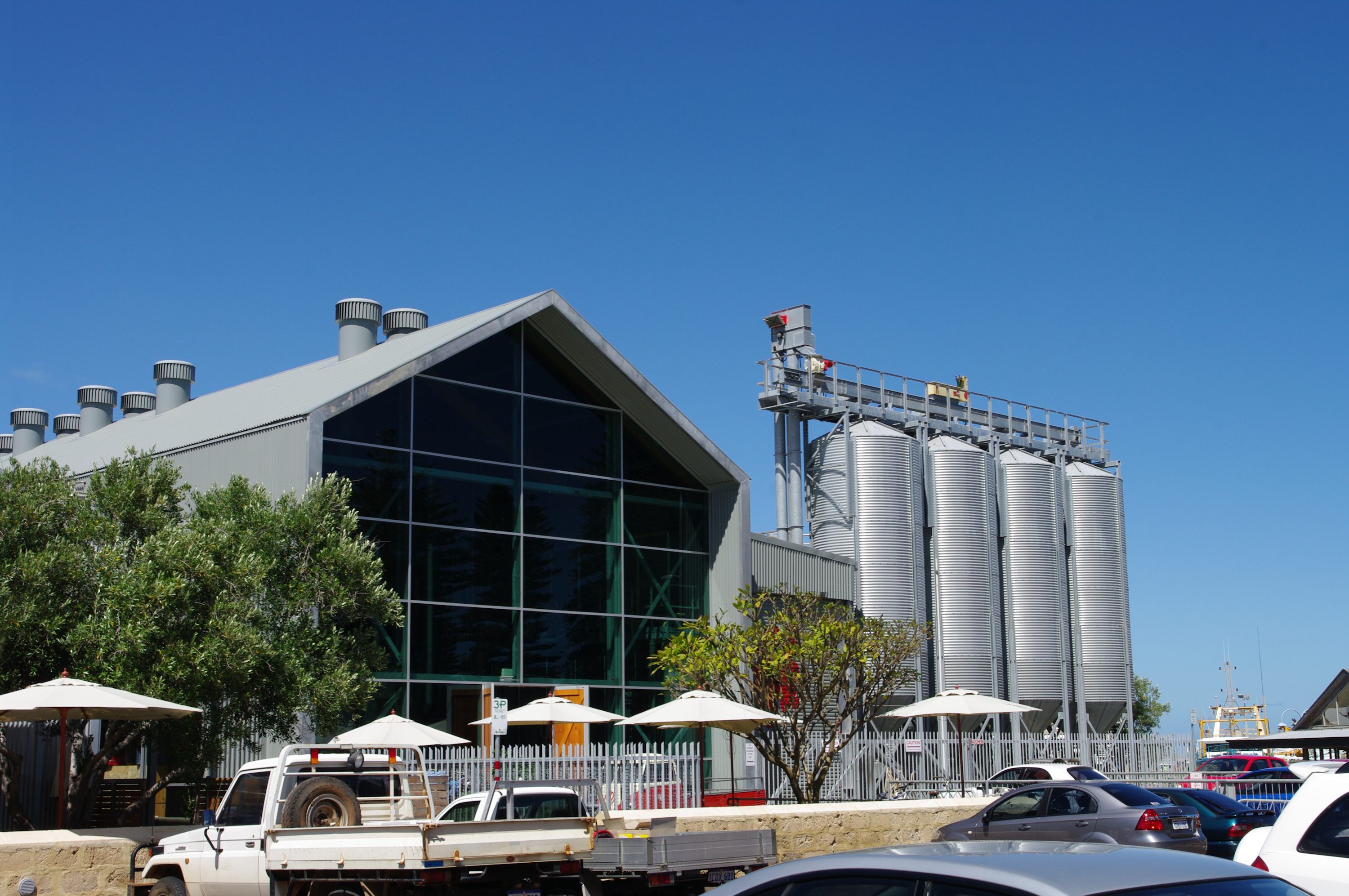
- Little Creatures Brewery at Fremantle Fishing Boat Harbour
- Industry: Alcoholic beverage
- Founded: 2000; 26 years ago
- Founder: Howard Cearns; Nic Trimboli; Phil Sexton
- Headquarters: Fremantle, Western Australia, Australia
- Products: Beer
- Parent: Little World Beverages

Little Creatures Brewery Pty Ltd is a brewery based in Fremantle, Western Australia, operating as a subsidiary of the Japanese firm Kirin Company. It is owned by Little World Beverages, a wholly owned subsidiary of Lion which is itself a wholly owned subsidiary of Kirin.

Little Creatures was originally established in 2000 by the original brewers of the Matilda Bay Brewing Company. The name Little Creatures is inspired by a song lyric from Talking Heads' album Little Creatures and refers to the live yeast cells that turn the sugars in malt wort into ethanol.

== History ==
Little Creatures Brewery was founded by Howard Cearns (a marketing specialist), Nic Trimboli (a restaurateur) and Phil Sexton (a master brewer), all of whom previously worked with the Matilda Bay Brewing Company. In 1997 Cearns, Trimboli and Sexton discussed the possibility of brewing an American style India Pale Ale. Sexton, having worked in the United States, was involved in the development of the BridgePort IPA. Cearns came up with the name after reading about little creatures wandering from ale house to ale house in J. R. R. Tolkien's The Hobbit and at the time thinking that it sounded like yeast fermentation. The brewery released its first beer, Little Creatures Pale Ale, in 2000. The Company sponsors the Fremantle Print Award. In 2008 the company established a second brewery in Healesville, Victoria. In 2012 the company was bought by Lion Nathan In 2013 another brewery was opened in Geelong, Victoria, at a cost of $60 million. Brewing capacity is reported as "10 million litres [2.6 million US gallons] a year, or 80 kegs an hour."

== Brewery ==
The brewery building was originally constructed to house the Taskforce '87 yachts (such as Kookaburra) participating in the 1987 America's Cup. But it housed a crocodile farm before being converted to its current use. The brewery is open to the public and contains a café restaurant.

== Brands ==
- The original Little Creatures Pale Ale is an American Pale Ale (5.2% alc/vol), brewed with Cascade (aroma) and Chinook (bittering) whole hop flowers, self-propagated yeast with a secondary bottle fermentation, and Australian malts.
- Rogers, an amber ale (3.8% alc/vol)
- Little Creatures Pilsner, a Pilsener (4.6% alc/vol), brewed with Tasmanian Helga, New Zealand Pacifica and Saaz hops.
- Little Creatures Bright Ale, a golden ale (4.5% alc/vol), brewed using a selection of four malts including Pale, Carapils, Munich and Vienna.
- Little Creatures Dog Days, a Sessions ale, hoppy beer that marries bright peachy, juicy-fruit hop flavours with a soft malt backbone. 4.4% alc/vol, 355ml can.(previously a Seasonal only beer)
- Pipsqueak Cider, an apple cider
- Furphy Refreshing ale, an ale made with 100% Victorian ingredients. 4.4% alc/vol, 375 ml (12.7 US fl oz) stubbie.

For the flagship Pale Ale, cool bottle fermentation is carried out with a lager yeast.

== Awards ==
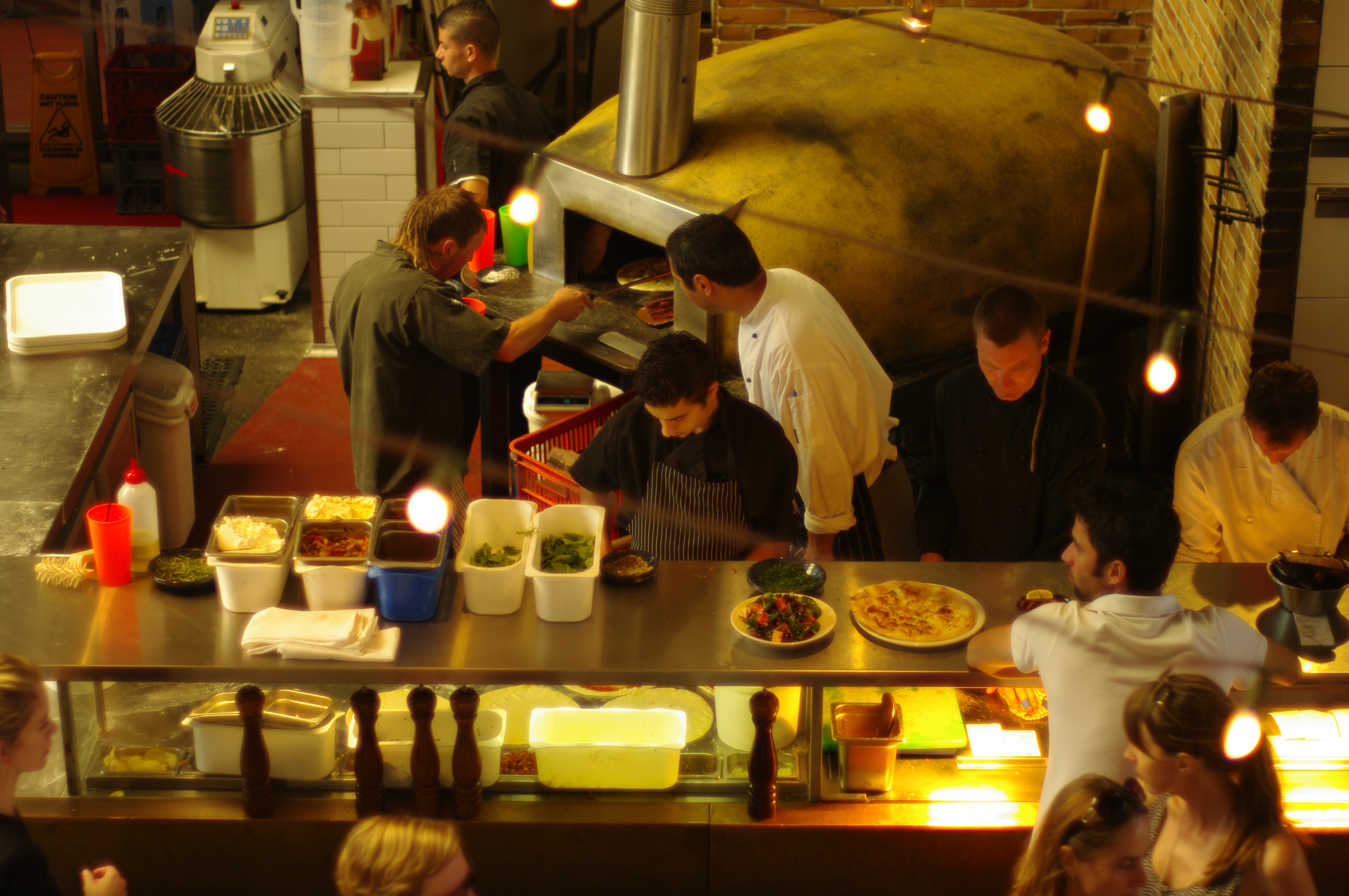
Making pizzas in Little Creatures

The brewery has won a number of Australian International Beer Awards. In 2002, Little Creatures Brewery was named Champion Australian Brewery, and its Pale Ale crowned as Champion Ale. The beer also won Choice magazine's 2003 Best Australian Ale and the 2004 BBC Good Food prize for Best Ale.

=== People's Choice ===
Little Creatures' beers have also featured in the annual GABS Hottest 100 Aussie Craft Beers of the Year event.

- 2008 1st place (Pale Ale)
- 2009 1st place (Pale Ale)
- 2010 2nd place (Pale Ale)
- 2012 3rd place (Pale Ale)
- 2013 3rd place (Pale Ale)

== See also ==
- List of breweries in Australia

== General references ==
- Deutsher, Keith M. (2012). The Breweries of Australia (2nd ed.). Glebe, NSW: Beer & Brewer Media. ISBN 978-0-98739-521-4.
