= Terry McCashin =

Rugby player and brewer (1944–2017)

- Born: Terence Michael McCashin; 18 January 1944 Palmerston North, New Zealand
- Died: 31 October 2017 (aged 73) Nelson, New Zealand
- Height: 1.78 m (5 ft 10 in)
- Weight: 87 kg (192 lb)
- School: Horowhenua College
- Occupation(s): Hotelier, brewer, farmer

Rugby union career
- Position: Hooker
Provincial / State sides
Years	Team	Apps	(Points)
1963–64, 68–69	Horowhenua		
1966–68, 70	Wellington	35	
1972	King Country	11	
1977	Marlborough	3	
International career
Years	Team	Apps	(Points)
1968	New Zealand	0	(0)

Terence Michael McCashin (18 January 1944 – 31 October 2017) was a New Zealand businessman who, together with his wife, founded the country's first craft brewery, McCashin's Brewery, in 1981 in Nelson.

He also represented the country in rugby union, playing seven matches for the All Blacks.

McCashin owned land in the Port Hills in Christchurch and started negotiating in 2016 with the Summit Road Society, a Port Hills protection society, about the sale of that land. The Summit Road Society purchased the 233 hectares (580 acres) in October 2018 from McCashin's estate.

== Personal life ==
McCashin died on 31 October 2017, aged 73. He is survived by wife Beverley and their five children.
