= Lion (Australasian company) =

Alcoholic beverage company operating in Australia and New Zealand, owned by Kirin

- Type: Subsidiary
- Industry: Beverage
- Founded: 1923; 103 years ago New Zealand Breweries; 1977; 49 years ago Lion Breweries; 1988; 38 years ago Lion Nathan; 2009; 17 years ago Lion Nathan National Foods
- Headquarters: Sydney, New South Wales, Australia
- Key people: Rod Eddington (chairman); Stuart Irvine (CEO)
- Products: Beer, wine, cider
- Parent: Kirin
- Subsidiaries: South Australian Brewing Company; James Boag Brewing; Hahn Brewing Company; James Squire Brewery; Castlemaine; Little Creatures Brewery; Vanguard Luxury Brands
- Website: www.lionco.com

Lion is an alcoholic beverage company that operates in Australia and New Zealand, and is a subsidiary of Japanese beverage conglomerate Kirin. It produces and markets a range of beer and cider in Australia, and wine in New Zealand and the United States through Distinguished Vineyards & Wine Partners. It acts as distributors for a range of spirits in New Zealand, but does not own any distilleries outright, although holding a 50% share of Four Pillars Gin in Victoria.

It was formed in October 2009 under the name Lion Nathan National Foods when Kirin Holdings Company Limited purchased brewer Lion Nathan and merged the business with National Foods, which it had owned since 2007. In 2011, the company changed its name to Lion, one company with three businesses: Lion Beer, Spirits, and Wine Australia; Lion, Beer, Spirits and Wine NZ; with National Foods becoming a Melbourne-based subsidiary called Lion Dairy & Drinks. Lion Dairy & Drinks was acquired by Bega in November 2020.

As of 2020 the Australian arm of the company is registered in Sydney as Lion-Beer Spirits & Wine Pty Ltd, a body corporate with multiple business names registered to it, including the Lion Nathan Australia, South Australian Brewing Company, James Boag Brewing, Byron Bay Brewery, Hahn Brewing Company, James Squire Brewery, Castlemaine, Little Creatures Brewery, and others.

Lion New Zealand is the largest alcoholic beverage company in the country, employing 1000 people. The company markets beers such as Speight's, Steinlager, Mac's, Emerson's, Stella Artois and Corona, big names in spirits such as Smirnoff, Baileys, Bacardi, and Johnnie Walker, and many wines.

The company owns a number of breweries and contract bottling plants in Australia and New Zealand. The Thebarton brewery in Adelaide operated by the South Australian Brewing Company is sometimes referred to as the West End Brewery (for other uses of this name, see West End Brewery).

== History ==
=== Antecedents ===
The original forerunner of the company was Brown Campbell & Co, the company of Logan Campbell and William Brown who established the Hobson Bridge Brewery in Auckland in 1840. By 1897 it was the largest brewery in the North Island if not the country. In May 1897 Brown Campbell & Co amalgamated with Louis Ehrenfried's Albert Brewery, which he had bought in 1878, to form Campbell and Ehrenfried. The new company was managed by Arthur Myers, Ehrenfried's nephew. In 1914 Campbell and Ehrenfried merged with the Great Northern Brewery, which owned the Lion brand. In 1923 ten breweries amalgamated to form New Zealand Breweries. Campbell and Ehrenfried merged its breweries into New Zealand Breweries but remained a separate company. Douglas Myers, grandson of Arthur Myers, became CEO of Campbell and Ehrenfried in 1965.

The northern division of New Zealand Breweries adopted the name Lion Breweries in 1977. Campbell and Ehrenfried bought 19.9 per cent of Lion Breweries in 1981. By the late 1980s, New Zealand Breweries had developed into one of New Zealand's largest companies. In 1988 Lion Breweries took over LD Nathan & Co, New Zealand's largest retailer, which at the time owned Woolworths NZ, to form Lion Nathan, listed on both the Australian and New Zealand stock exchanges under the symbol LNN. The same year, Woolworths' general merchandise division was rebranded DEKA, with ownership transferred to the Farmers Trading Company in 1992. In 1990 it became an Australasian business when it established a major presence in Australia by securing management control of Bond Corporation’s brewing assets, including the Tooheys Brewery in Sydney and Castlemaine Perkins in Brisbane. In 1998 Douglas Myers sold most of his 16 percent share in Lion Nathan to Kirin Brewery Company of Japan.

=== Foundation ===
In 2005, Lion Nathan made a takeover bid for the independent South Australian Coopers Brewery. The takeover was strongly opposed by Coopers' management, and was rejected at an Extraordinary General Meeting when 93.4% of the shareholders voted in favour of permanently removing the "3rd tier purchasing rights" of Lion Nathan, effectively preventing any current or future takeover bid. In September 2009, shareholders voted in favour of a complete takeover by Kirin Holdings.

In 2006 Lion formed BevChain, a 50:50 joint venture with Linfox to provide logistics services to the drinks industry. Linfox took full ownership in 2017.

Lion was established in October 2009 under the name Lion Nathan National Foods when Kirin purchased the brewer Lion Nathan and merged the business with National Foods, which it had owned since 2007. The company was 46% owned by Kirin, with the difference made up by Australian and New Zealand share funds.

=== 2010s ===
In 2011, the company changed its name to Lion, one company with three businesses: Lion Beer, Spirits, and Wine Australia; Lion, Beer, Spirits and Wine NZ; with National Foods becoming a Melbourne-based subsidiary called Lion Dairy & Drinks. Lion Dairy & Drinks was acquired by Bega in November 2020.

In June 2013, the company launched the Tap King draught beer product that is sold with a CO_{2} gas chamber so that consumers can drink draught beer at home. Lionel Richie appeared in a television commercial to promote the device and reportedly received A$$1.5 million to appear in the promotional campaign. The introduction of the Tap King caused controversy, due to the perceived impact upon alcohol venues. Concerns were raised in regard to lower patronage rates for venues due to a greater incentive for consumers to drink beer in home environments.

=== Present ===
As of 2020 the Australian arm of the company is registered in Sydney as Lion-Beer Spirits & Wine Pty Ltd, a body corporate with multiple business names registered to it, including the Lion Nathan Australia, South Australian Brewing Company, James Boag Brewing, Byron Bay Brewery, Hahn Brewing Company, James Squire Brewery, Castlemaine, Little Creatures Brewery, and others.

Lion New Zealand is the largest alcoholic beverage company in the country, employing 1000 people. The company markets beers such as Speight's, Steinlager, Mac's, Emerson's, Stella Artois and Corona, big names in spirits such as Smirnoff, Baileys, Bacardi, and Johnnie Walker, and many wines.

== Breweries and beers ==
=== Australia ===
==== Castlemaine Tooheys ====
Located in Brisbane, Queensland, Castlemaine Perkins is the brewer of the XXXX brand of beers. In March 1980, Castlemaine Perkins merged with Tooheys to form Castlemaine Tooheys. Bond Corporation purchased Castlemaine Tooheys in 1985. Castlemaine Tooheys was acquired in 1992 by Lion Nathan.

==== SA Brewing Company/West End ====
Prior to the acquisition of the brewing assets by Lion Nathan in 1993, the South Australian Brewing Company split its brewing assets into "SA Brewing Holdings", and its diversified operations were formed into a new listed company named Southcorp. The SA Brewing Company continued to trade under that name as an Australian private company until 1 May 2019, but from 21 January 2019 was subsumed as a registered business name under Lion-Beer Spirits & Wine Pty Ltd, being a body corporate registered in Sydney.

As of 2020 the only beer brewed under the West End brand is West End Draught, a currently a 4.5% abv pale lager, first brewed in 1859. (West End Export, West End Gold, and West End Light are no longer produced.)

The Thebarton site finally closed on 17 June 2021, with about a third of the workforce, mainly those in sales and sponsorship roles, staying on with the company in South Australia. The company said that West End beer would be produced at its other breweries and that it would maintain the same recipe.

==== Malt Shovel/James Squire ====
James Squire beers are mostly produced by the Malt Shovel Brewery in Sydney. The brewery has won various awards including: Champion Australasian Brewery, 2000 and 2003 (Australian International Beer Awards), and Best Bohemian-Style Pilsener, 2008 (World Beer Cup). Since 2017, Malt Shovel also brews the originally New Zealand Panhead range of beers.

==== Other Australian brands ====
Other Australian beer breweries and labels owned by Lion as of December 2020 are Hahn, Emu/Swan, James Boag, Little Creatures, Iron Jack (Sydney), Furphy (brewed in Geelong, Victoria), Stone & Wood (brewed in Byron Bay, New South Wales), White Rabbit, Byron Bay Brewery and Kosciuszko.

=== New Zealand ===
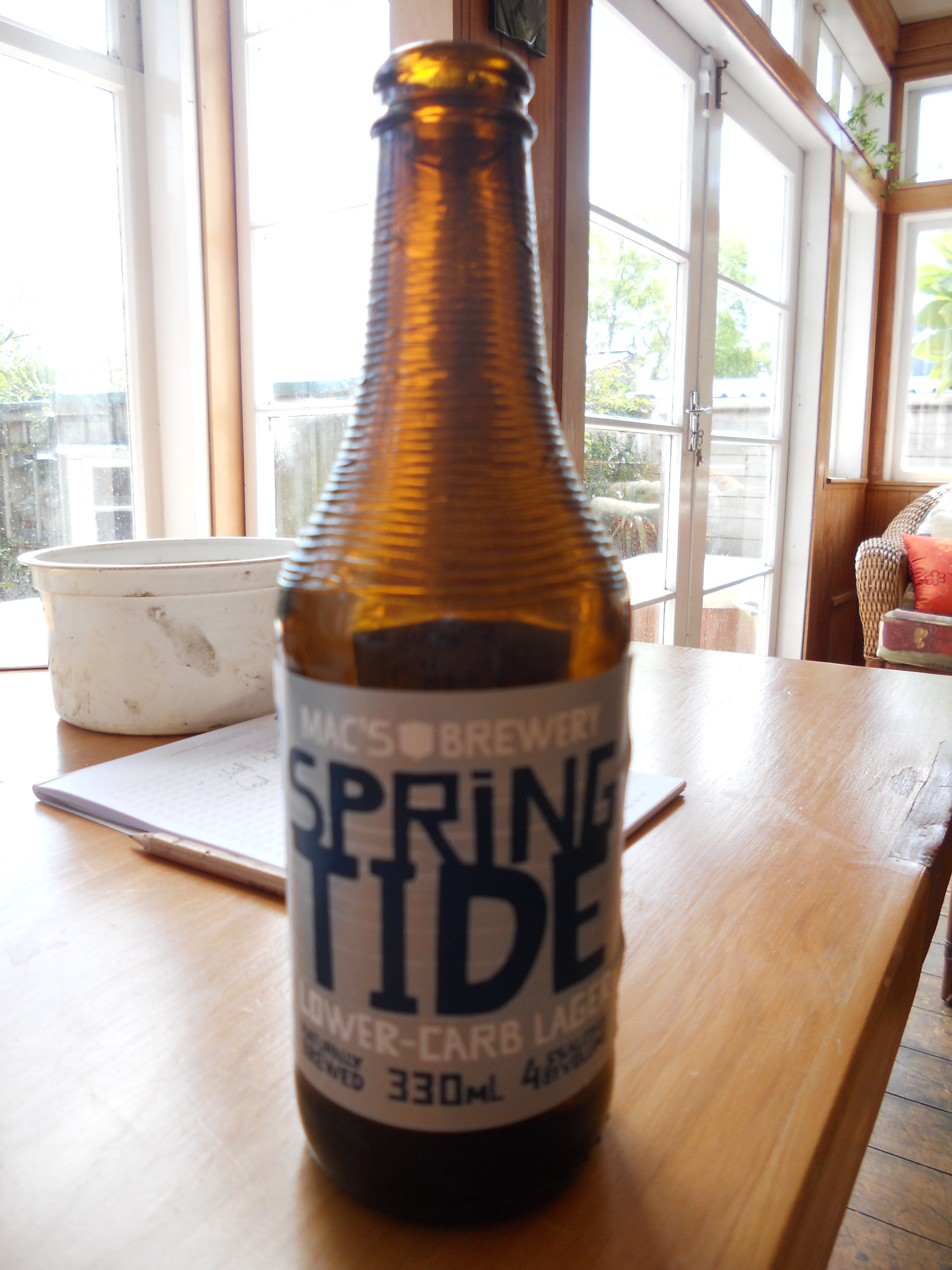
Mac's Brewery Spring Tide beer bottle

==== Mac's craft beers ====
Mac's craft beers were produced in New Zealand's first significant craft brewery, McCashin's Brewery, in 1981, by Terry McCashin. Lion acquired the brand in 1999, but the original brewery continues to produce craft beers under a different name (Stoke).

A wide range of styles of beers in both bottles and cans continue to be sold under Mac's branding, As of 2020 including Mac's Gold (lager), Black Mac (a dark lager), and Hop Rocker (golden pilsener). The website continues to list the back catalogue of Mac's beers as well.

==== Other NZ beers ====
As of December 2020, Lion owns the Emerson's Brewery, Speight's, Steinlager, Lion Red, Lion Brown, Panhead, Little Creatures, Waikato Draught, Black Ice, Rheineck and Lion Ice brands.

(Canterbury Draught, first brewed in 1854 as Ward's Beer after the brewer Hamilton Ward and rebranded as Canterbury Draught in 1990, was associated with the Canterbury Cricket Association through sponsorship by Lion. However, the Christchurch earthquakes in 2011 put the brewery out of business.)

=== International brands ===
The following beer brands are as of December 2020 brewed and/or marketed in Australia by Lion:

- Corona (March 2012 to present)
- Budweiser (December 2009 to present)
- Stella Artois
- Beck's
- Guinness (Draught and Extra Stout brewed in Australia)
- Kilkenny (Draught brewed in Australia)
- Kirin Ichiban and Kirin Megumi
- Pacifico (brewed "mainly" in Mexico)
- Belle-Vue Kriek
- Hoegaarden
- Leffe
- Negra Modelo
- Boddington's
- Oranjeboom

== Ciders ==
Lion owns 5 Seeds, James Squire, Kirin, and Pipsqueak (Little Creatures) ciders.

== Wines ==
As of 2020 Lion does not have interests in any Australian wine brands.

In 2001 the Lion Nathan Wine group purchased a controlling interest in Australian wine companies Petaluma and Banksia, adding New Zealand wine company Wither Hills in 2002. In 2005, Fine Wine Partners (FWP) was established as a joint venture between distributors Distinguished Vineyards and Tucker Seabrook, Robert Hirst's company. Lion bought out Tucker Seabrook in 2008, becoming sole owner of the company. FWP included the brands Petaluma, Croser, St Hallett, Knappstein, Stonier and Tatachilla, four wineries, and a large distribution network. In 2016, Accolade Wines acquired FWP, with Lion concentrating its core business of beer and cider in Australia, but continuing to hold wine businesses in New Zealand and the United States.

Distinguished Vineyards & Wine Partners was founded in 2008, and as of December 2020 owns a number of wineries and brands in the US (including Markham Vineyards and Textbook Wines in the Napa Valley of California) as well as in New Zealand (such as Wither Hills, Mt Difficulty and Lindauer).

== Spirits ==
In 2006, Lion bought ready-to-drink McKenna Bourbon from its parent company, Kirin. In 2007 it bought Inner Circle Rum, which included a distillery in Beenleigh, Queensland. While retaining ownership of the two brands, in a 2008 joint venture with Bacardi-Martini, Lion Bacardi would be marketing the two brands.

In 2020 McKenna Bourbon is owned by Heaven Hill distillers in the US. The only mention of this and a wide range of other spirits on the website is with regard to their distribution in New Zealand by Lion.

In March 2019, Lion acquired a 50% stake in Victorian small distillery Four Pillars Gin. and in July 2023 it acquired the remaining 50% stake it previously didn't own for a rumored $50M AUD, becoming the outright owner of the Healesville-based distillery.

In November 2020 Four Pillars were awarded as the World's best Gin producer for the second year running at the International Wine and Spirit Competition.

== See also ==
- List of breweries in Australia
