= Emma Boos-Jegher =

Swiss feminist (1857–1932)

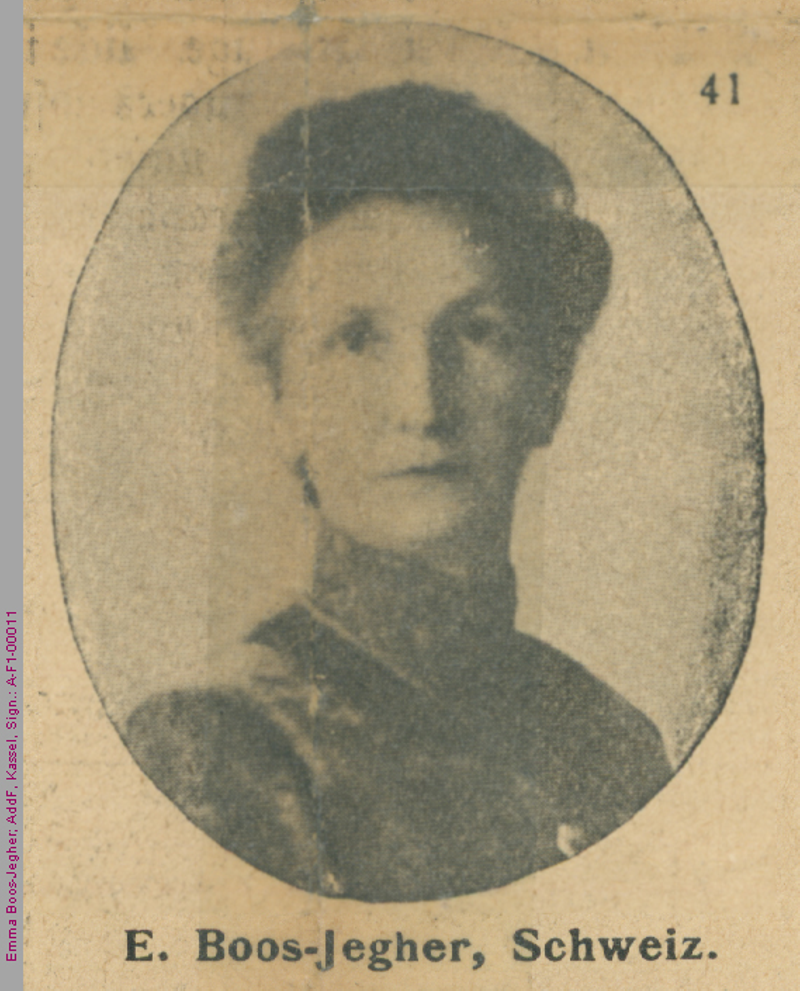
- Boos-Jegher in Der Welt-Spiegel, 1904
- Born: Emma Jegher; 26 February 1857; Trieste
- Died: 21 December 1932 (aged 75); Zurich, Switzerland
- Occupations: Teacher; school director
- Spouse: Eduard Boos (m. 1885; died 1928)
- Children: 4
- Parents: Gaudenz Jegher (father); Adelheid Geisslinger (mother)

Emma Boos-Jegher (born Emma Jegher; married name Emma Boos; 26 February 1857 – 21 December 1932) was a Swiss feminist, for some thirty years one of the most progressive and active in German-speaking Switzerland. She co-founded the Schweizerischer Gemeinnütziger Frauenverein (Swiss Charitable Women's Association) in 1888 and was president of the Union für Frauenbestrebungen Zürich (Zurich Union for Women's Endeavors) from 1896 to 1903 and from 1912 to 1914. In 1899, with Helene von Mülinen and Camille Vidart, she initiated the founding of the Federation of Swiss Women's Associations (BSF).

== Biography ==
The Neumünster school of art and women's work at Mühlebachstrasse 8 in Riesbach. Lithograph, probably printed in 1886 by Hofer & Burger, Zurich

Emma Jegher was the daughter of Gaudenz Jegher, a commercial employee, and Adelheid née Geisslinger, and she grew up in Trieste. She obtained a diploma as a teacher of foreign languages and taught at a girls' school in Zurich. In 1885 she married Eduard Boos, an institute director (Institutsvorsteher) and trades association secretary (Gewerbesekretär). From 1886 the couple ran the Neumünster school of art and women's work (Kunst- und Frauenarbeitsschule Neumünster) in Riesbach. They had four children, born between 1887 and 1892.

In 1885 Boos-Jegher took part in founding the Schweizerischer Frauen-Verband (Swiss Women's Association), and its constituent assembly elected her vice-president. After conflicts on its board, she founded the Schweizerischer Gemeinnütziger Frauenverein in 1888 with Rosina Gschwind-Hofer and Emma Coradi-Stahl, and she served on its board for several years. In 1887 she was also among the founders of the Zurich Women's League for the Promotion of Morality (Frauenbund zur Hebung der Sittlichkeit).

Because she could not win support in the Schweizerischer Gemeinnütziger Frauenverein for her proposals to improve women's vocational training, Boos-Jegher joined the Verein Frauenbildungs-Reform (Association for the Reform of Women's Education) in 1893, the year it was founded, and became its president. In 1896 the association merged with the legal protection association (Rechtsschutzverein) of Emilie Kempin-Spyri to form the Union für Frauenbestrebungen Zürich. At first the Union campaigned mainly for better working conditions for women in the service sector, but it then also firmly demanded the legal and political equality of the sexes. For more than two decades Boos-Jegher largely shaped its program. She was president of the Union from 1896 to 1903 and from 1912 to 1914, and she soon became the spokeswoman of the progressive wing of the women's movement in Zurich.

Under her leadership the Union obtained the admission of women to the bar in the canton of Zurich in 1898, drew up several submissions on the Civil Code, and from 1896 repeatedly took the demand for women's suffrage to the public. The Union also built up a wide range of services for women, organized lecture series, and from 1903 published the periodical Frauenbestrebungen. Boos-Jegher, who early on sought a national coordination of the political activities of the various women's organizations, wrote many articles for it.

In 1896 she helped to prepare the First Congress for Women's Interests in Geneva, and in 1899, with Helene von Mülinen and Camille Vidart, she initiated the founding of the Federation of Swiss Women's Associations (Bund Schweizerischer Frauenorganisationen, BSF). She represented the BSF several times at meetings of the International Council of Women (Frauenweltbund), and from 1912 to 1916 she was the BSF's vice-president. In 1923 the BSF recognized her pioneering work with honorary life membership.

After 1914 Boos-Jegher gradually withdrew from the leading bodies of the women's movement. After the death in 1928 of her husband, with whom she had worked closely in professional and political matters, she withdrew from public life for good. For some thirty years she was one of the most progressive and active feminists in German-speaking Switzerland. Although she had no university education, she was a respected specialist in legal and economic questions. Unlike other pioneers of the women's movement, however, she was almost forgotten, and only more recent research has looked more closely at her work again.

== Bibliography ==
- Schweizer Frauenblatt, 1933, no. 1
- Nora Escher, Entwicklungstendenzen der Frauenbewegung in der deutschen Schweiz, 1850–1918/19, 1985
- Beatrix Mesmer, Ausgeklammert – Eingeklammert. Frauen und Frauenorganisationen in der Schweiz des 19. Jahrhunderts, 1988

=== Archives ===
- Archiv Gosteli-Foundation, Worblaufen, Dossier Emma Boos-Jegher
