= FreedomPop =

American wireless Internet and mobile virtual network operator

- Type: Private
- Founded: Los Angeles, California, US (2011)
- Founder: Stephen Stokols, Steven Sesar
- Headquarters: Los Angeles
- Area served: United States; United Kingdom; Spain; Mexico
- Key people: Stephen Stokols, (CEO); Steven Sesar, (COO)
- Products: IP mobile services, mobile phones, tablets, broadband devices
- Owner: Red Pocket Mobile
- Website: www.freedompop.com (US) www.freedompop.mx (Mexico)

FreedomPop is a wireless Internet and mobile virtual network operator based in Los Angeles, California. The company provided "free" IP mobile services including free data, text and VoIP and sells mobile phones, tablets and broadband devices for use with their service. In 2024 FreedomPop stopped offering free services, and now offers low-cost packages targeting older and retired people who may have lower requirements for data, texting, and calling. It was founded by CEO Stephen Stokols and Steven Sesar, and owned and operated by STS Media Inc until June 2019 when it was successfully sold. FreedomPop uses networks of T-Mobile and AT&T in the United States, Three in the UK, Yoigo in Spain, and Telcel in Mexico.

== History ==
FreedomPop was co-founded by Stephen Stokols, CEO and Steven Sesar in 2011. Prior to founding FreedomPop, Stokols served as CEO of Woo Media, a video-chat and entertainment startup. FreedomPop partnered with LightSquared in December 2011, but ended its partnership after LightSquared did not receive Federal Communications Commission (FCC) approval to build out its network. FreedomPop began selling 4G only hotspots in October 2012. The company began offering mobile and wireless internet services in the United States using Clearwire's 4G network. FreedomPop converted 20% of its free user base to paid users in December 2012.

In July 2012, FreedomPop raised $7.5 million in a first round of funding led by Mangrove Capital and Doll Capital Management. In April 2013, FreedomPop partnered with Sprint to expand its coverage to include 3G and 4G with Sprint compatible devices. The company raised an additional $4.3 million in a Series A1 financing from Mangrove Capital and Doll Capital Management in July 2013. In October 2013, one year from its initial wireless broadband launch, FreedomPop launched its beta free mobile phone plan that included voice, text, and data service. In November FreedomPop launched a bring your own device for Sprint-compatible phones.

FreedomPop began supporting and selling Sprint-compatible iPhones in April 2014. The company also released an iOS app that offers voice, text and voicemail service to users within the United States. A month later, in May 2014, FreedomPop began supporting LTE Android smartphones. In July the company announced it would soon be offering SIM card-based plans in Belgium in partnership with Dutch carrier KPN. FreedomPop does not sell mobile devices outside of the United States. In July 2014, FreedomPop began offering its free 4G data, voice and text plans to tablet users, starting with the iPad Mini and the Samsung Tab 3. The free data, voice and text plan is offered to those purchasing a tablet through FreedomPop or other eligible bring your own device Sprint devices. In October 2014, FreedomPop announced its own branded-line of low-cost smartphones and tablets. The first release was a 7-inch Wi-Fi only tablet, the FreedomPop Liberty, which has free voice and SMS text messaging.

In June 2019, it was announced that the FreedomPop's remaining retail business and brand name had been sold to Red Pocket Mobile, alongside FreedomPop's GSMA customer base. Full terms of the deal were not disclosed.

In July 2019, FreedomPop emailed some of its customers to let them know it had transferred their numbers to the MVNO Ting: "FreedomPop and UNREAL Mobile have made a deal to move all customers currently on the Sprint network to Ting Mobile, an industry-leading service provider on the Sprint Network."

== Expansion ==
In January 2015, FreedomPop started the first aggregated nationwide wifi. The service offers consumers unlimited voice, text and wifi for $5 per month. In May 2015, FreedomPop announced an expansion into the UK with free mobile data, voice and text. The company will be operating through a sim-only service. In September 2015, FreedomPop announced free and low-cost iPhone plans in the United States and plans to sell the iPhone 6S in October. FreedomPop also announced the launch of its free mobile-phone service in the UK. In November 2015, FreedomPop announced a partnership with Intel to create a WiFi-focused smartphone. The smartphone will be based on Intel's Sofia mobile chipset and be able to switch between WiFi and cellular during a phone call.

In June 2015, FreedomPop raised $30 million in a Series B funding round led by Partech Ventures with participation from Doll Capital Management and Mangrove Capital. The company announced $10 million in funding led by Axiata in July 2015. FreedomPop received an investment from Intel in November 2015, which the company planned to use to build out a new broadband service to rival Google Project Fi. The firm has raised over $109 million in financing, including a $50 million Series C in early 2016. In January 2016, six months after its Series B round of $36 million, FreedomPop raised $50 million in a Series C round for global expansion of its services. The company has raised a total of $109 million.

In April 2016, FreedomPop announced that its services would become available in Spain, making it the company's third supported country following the US and UK. FreedomPop launched its free mobile platform in Spain for users of the FreedomPop SIM in July 2016. By August 2016, the company offered zero-rated WhatsApp usage in more than 30 countries, including the US and Spain.

By November 2017, the company had partnered with Target to sell its handsets, SIM cards and services. In 2018, FreedomPop licensed its customer conversion platform to Prudential Financial.

== Services ==
Jared Newman, a Time reporter, reviewed FreedomPop's core service in June 2013. Newman reported that some service fees were not clearly noted on FreedomPop's homepage. FreedomPop responded to the criticism by waiving the active status fee for new users as of July 2013.

The service offered by FreedomPop is designed for "light users", while paid options include unlimited talk and text with an option to add high-speed data. The "Unlimited Everything Plan" introduced in May drops from 4G LTE data to 3G after 1 GB of data is used within a billing cycle. In June 2015, this drops to 256 kbit/s for users that signed up before June 2015 or 128 kbit/s for users who signed up after June 2015. The service is only available in select locations. The carrier reportedly has good coverage, though the call quality "can be an issue," according to Clark Howard.

In January 2016, FreedomPop added a roaming SIM, known as the "Global SIM", for free data abroad use in the United States and United Kingdom. Service is provided by a global mobile connection service Fogg Mobile which uses AT&T and T-Mobile as roaming partners in the United States. The company announced plans to expand roaming coverage to Southeast Asia and Latin America by the end of 2016. On October 17, 2018, Freedompop informed the UK users of the Global SIM that this service would be discontinued on October 20. It justified this on the grounds of poor performance of its service partner. The users were encouraged to switch to an LTE national SIM, which unlike the Global SIM, provides coverage only inside the UK. The Global SIMs were deactivated a few days later.

In November 2016, FreedomPop launched FreedomShop in the United States, Britain, Mexico and Spain, to sell refurbished smartphones at up to 80% off the manufacturer's suggested retail price.

On July 2, 2017, FreedomPop started throttling users who did not pay for their new $4.99 Speed Boost Service. Users with free plans without the service were throttled to 1 Mbit/s while users of paid plans were throttled to 5 Mbit/s. However, this throttling only affected users on the Sprint network and not the Global or LTE SIM.

On August 28, 2017, FreedomPop reduced the total extra data from Freedom Friends 1000 MB to 500 MB. Previously, a user would get a maximum of 500 MB every month from adding Freedom Friends then their friends could share data to that user for an additional 500 MB. With the new change, if a user has the maximum 500 MB from adding Freedom Friends then they can not receive any more data through data sharing.

On July 10, 2018, FreedomPop reduced the total extra data from Freedom Friends from 500 MB to 50 MB.

On October 15, 2020, FreedomPop announced native cellular service—users no longer need the FreedomPop Messaging app for calling and texting. Other upgraded features include FaceTime calls over the cellular network and compatibility with major banking and other mobile applications, unlimited iMessages and RCS text messages (WiFi only).

As of June 2024, the free/freemium plans are no longer available. The base plan is $10/month for 1GB of high-speed 5G data.

== Recognition ==
In 2015, The Economist recognized FreedomPop and its "Wi-Fi first" technology, noting that the company developed the idea for its customers to send texts and make calls over Wi-Fi connections primarily when available. According to an Engadget report, FreedomPop's SIM-only service in the UK had strong signal quality with minor call quality issues and is meant for light streamers. The report noted that the service is a "seriously attractive alternative" to major carriers.

== Networks ==
FreedomPop uses T-Mobile's and AT&T's networks in the United States.

In 2015 the company announced its plans to expand internationally to the UK on Three's network.

In early 2016, FreedomPop launched a global SIM with Free mobile data across 25 countries, including the US and UK.

In late 2016, FreedomPop launched an LTE SIM utilizing AT&T's network.

In January 2018, users reported that FreedomPop sent customers e-mails noting that the Globe SIM will incur a $4.99 a month charge, asking users to switch to the LTE GSM SIM to avoid charges.

As of September 2018, FreedomPop LTE SIM users are required to have a non-refundable "top-off" balance or credit of $20.00 in their account to use the "Basic 200 free" plan. This "top-off" balance will expire if not used for 30 day and users will be charged $20 again if they go over data limit.

Network	Sample Offering	Technology	Data from Free Plan	IP Address	Voice Communication	Roaming
AT&T	LTE GSM SIM	4G/GSM	25MB	US	Cellular Voice or VoIP	No
Three	4G SIM	4G/GSM	200MB	UK	Cellular Voice or VoIP	No
Orange with MásMóvil Platform	4G SIM	4G/GSM	200MB	ES	Cellular Voice or VoIP	No
Telcel	4G SIM	4G/GSM	100MB	MX	Cellular or VoIP	Yes

== See also ==
- giffgaff
- List of VoIP companies
- SkypeIn
- SkypeOut
- Suop
