= Gertrud Villiger-Keller =

Swiss women's charity leader (1843–1908)

- Born: Gertrud Keller; 15 August 1843; Lenzburg, Aargau, Switzerland
- Died: 5 April 1908 (aged 64); Ludwigshafen, German Empire
- Occupation: Women's association leader
- Spouse: Fidel Villiger (m. 1866)
- Parents: Augustin Keller (father); Josefine Pfeiffer (mother)
- Relatives: Michael Traugott Pfeiffer (grandfather); Leonz Villiger (father-in-law)

Gertrud Villiger-Keller (born Gertrud Keller; also Gertrud Villiger; 15 August 1843 – 5 April 1908) was a Swiss women's association leader from Lenzburg. From 1889 until her death she was central president of the Swiss Charitable Women's Association (SGF), which under her leadership became the largest and, for a time, the most influential women's umbrella organization in Switzerland. At her instigation the association concentrated on home economics education, and she involved it in carrying out state tasks.

== Biography ==
Gertrud Keller was born on 15 August 1843 in Lenzburg, the daughter of Augustin Keller, a politician active in school and church affairs, and Josefine Pfeiffer, and the granddaughter of the music educator Michael Traugott Pfeiffer. She grew up in Wettingen and Aarau and received a broad education. Even in her youth she moved in the circle of her father's radical-liberal party friends. In 1866 she married Fidel Villiger, a lawyer and politician and the son of the politician Leonz Villiger.

After her marriage Villiger-Keller first devoted herself to raising her children and was active in local charity. She presided over the women's charitable association (Gemeinnütziger Frauenverein) in Lenzburg, and in 1887 she founded the town's school for domestic servants (Dienstbotenschule).

Her main public work began in 1888 with the founding of the Swiss Charitable Women's Association (Schweizerischer Gemeinnütziger Frauenverein, SGF). She was one of its co-founders, together with Emma Coradi-Stahl. In 1889 she was elected central president, and she led the association with political skill until her death. At her instigation it concentrated above all on home economics education and helped to set up housekeeping schools and schools for domestic servants. She also recognized the importance of the new professions for women and supported Anna Heer in founding the nursing school (Pflegerinnenschule) in Zurich. Under her leadership the SGF quickly became the largest and, for a time, the most influential women's umbrella organization in Switzerland. In 1893 it joined the Swiss Society for the Common Good (Schweizerische Gemeinnützige Gesellschaft), and in 1894 it became a collective member of the Swiss Red Cross.

Although Villiger-Keller distanced herself in words from any political activity, she succeeded in winning official recognition for women's achievements in welfare and women's education, and in involving the association in carrying out state tasks: from 1895 the federal government subsidized home economics education, and in 1899 the Federal Military Department entrusted the SGF with the placement of home work (Heimarbeit). In 1903 she was made an honorary citizen of Lenzburg. She died in Ludwigshafen on 5 April 1908.

== Bibliography ==
- Frieda Maria Huggenberg, Frauen dienen der Heimat. Drei soziale Frauenleben, 1939, 31–61
- Johanna Henz, "Gertrud Villiger", in Lebensbilder aus dem Aargau, 1953, 433–437
- Beatrix Mesmer, Ausgeklammert – Eingeklammert. Frauen und Frauenorganisationen in der Schweiz des 19. Jahrhunderts, 1988, 177–195
