= Villiger =

Villiger is a German surname. Notable people with the surname include:

- Burchard Villiger (1816–1903), Swiss-American jesuit priest
- Claudia Villiger (born 1969), Swiss figure skater
- Gertrud Villiger-Keller (1843–1908), Swiss women's association leader
- Kaspar Villiger (born 1941), Swiss industrialist and politician
- Leonz Villiger (1811–1893), Swiss politician
- Mark Villiger (born 1950), South African judge
- René Villiger (1931–2010), Swiss painter
- Victor Villiger (1868–1934), Swiss-German chemist
  - Baeyer–Villiger oxidation
- Walther Augustin Villiger (1872–1938), Swiss-German astronomer

== See also ==
- Villiger Sons
