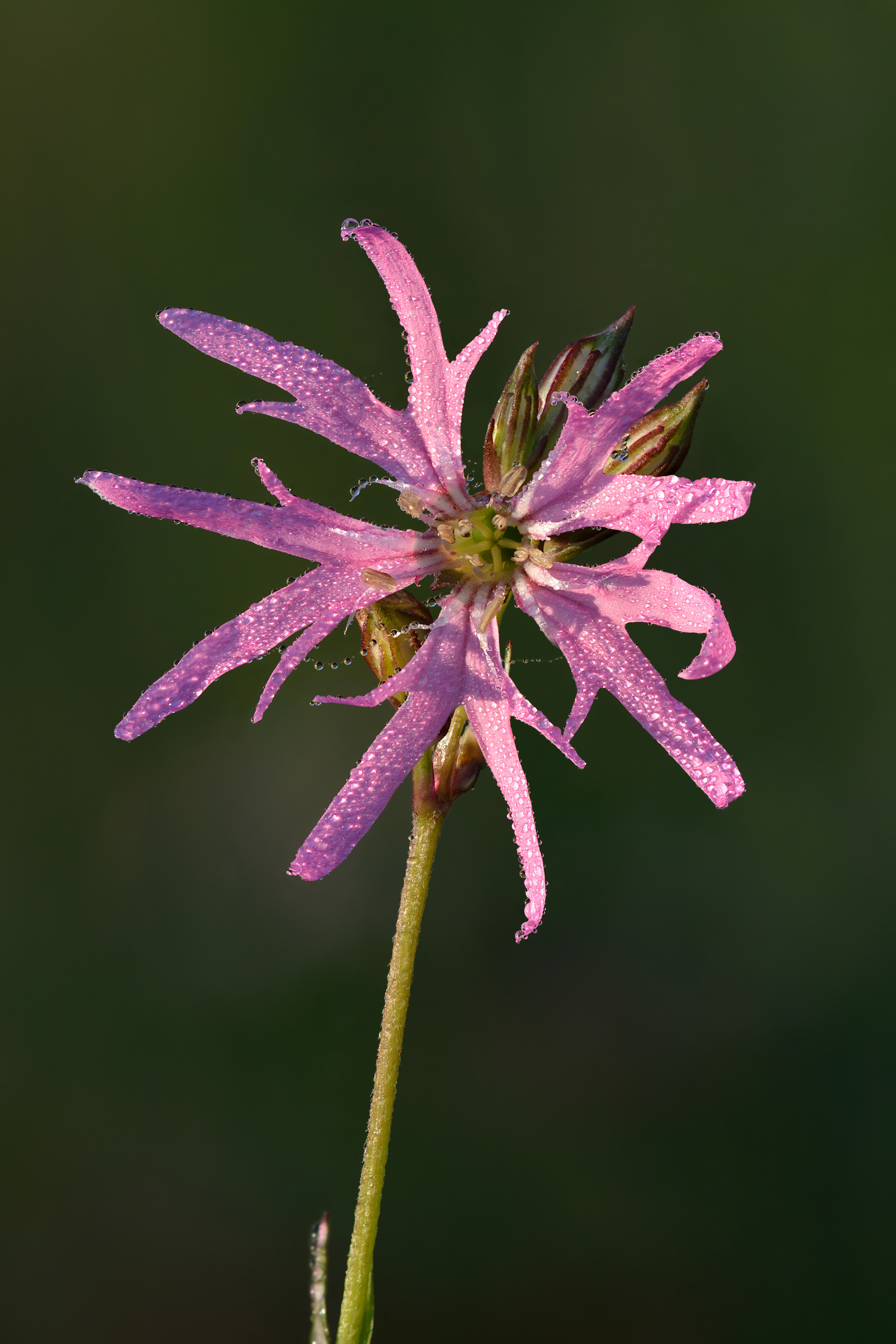

Scientific classification
- Kingdom: Plantae
- Clade: Embryophytes
- Clade: Tracheophytes
- Clade: Spermatophytes
- Clade: Angiosperms
- Clade: Eudicots
- Order: Caryophyllales
- Family: Caryophyllaceae
- Genus: Silene
- Species: S. flos-cuculi

Binomial name
- Silene flos-cuculi (L.) Greuter & Burdet

Synonyms
- Coronaria flos-cuculi (L.) A.Braun; Lychnis flos-cuculi L.

= Silene flos-cuculi =

Species of flowering plant

Silene flos-cuculi (syn. Lychnis flos-cuculi), the ragged-robin, is a perennial herbaceous plant in the family Caryophyllaceae. It is native to Eurasia and Siberia and has been introduced to North America.

== Description ==
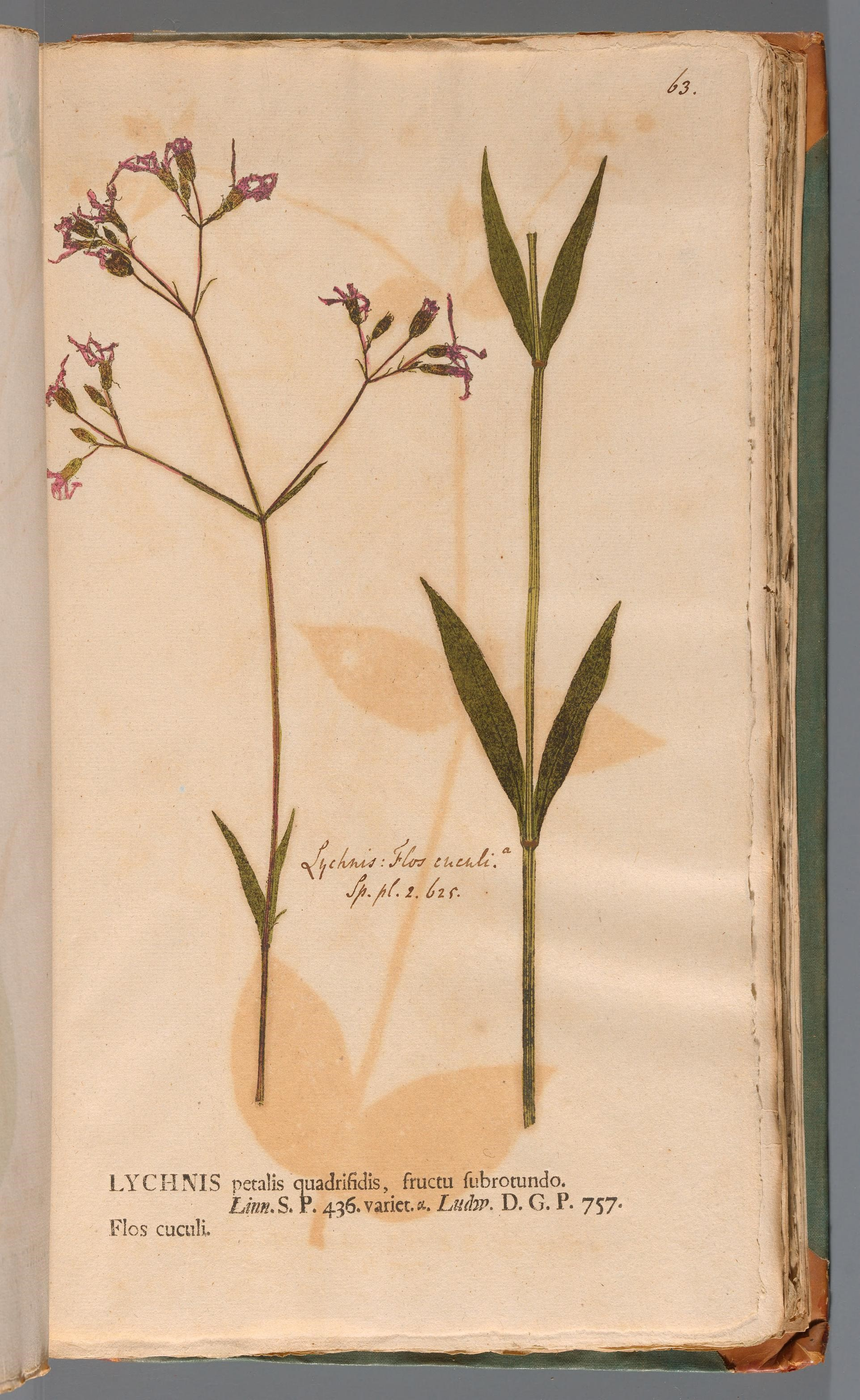
"Lychnis flos-cuculi" in Botanica in Originali, by Johann Hieronymus Kniphof

Silene flos-cuculi forms a rosette of low growing foliage with numerous stems 30 to 90 centimetres (12 to 35 1/2 inches) tall. The stems rise above the foliage and branch near the top of the stem. The leaves are paired, with the lower leaves spoon-shaped and stalked. The middle and upper leaves are linear-lanceolate with pointed apexes. All of the leaves are untoothed. The stems have barbed hairs pointing downward and these hairs make the plant rough to the touch.

Blooming from May to August (and occasionally later), the pink flowers are 3 to 4 cm (1.2 to 1.6 in) wide. They have five narrow petals deeply divided into four lobes giving the flower an untidy, ragged appearance, hence its common name. The calyx tube is five-toothed with ten stamens. There are 5 separate styles.

The fruits consist of small (6 to 10 mm) capsules opening on top by five teeth and containing many small seeds; they are found on the plants from August onward.

== Distribution and habitat ==
The species is native to Europe and Asia, where it is found along roads and in wet meadows and pastures. It has also become naturalized in parts of the northern United States and eastern Canada.

== Ecology ==
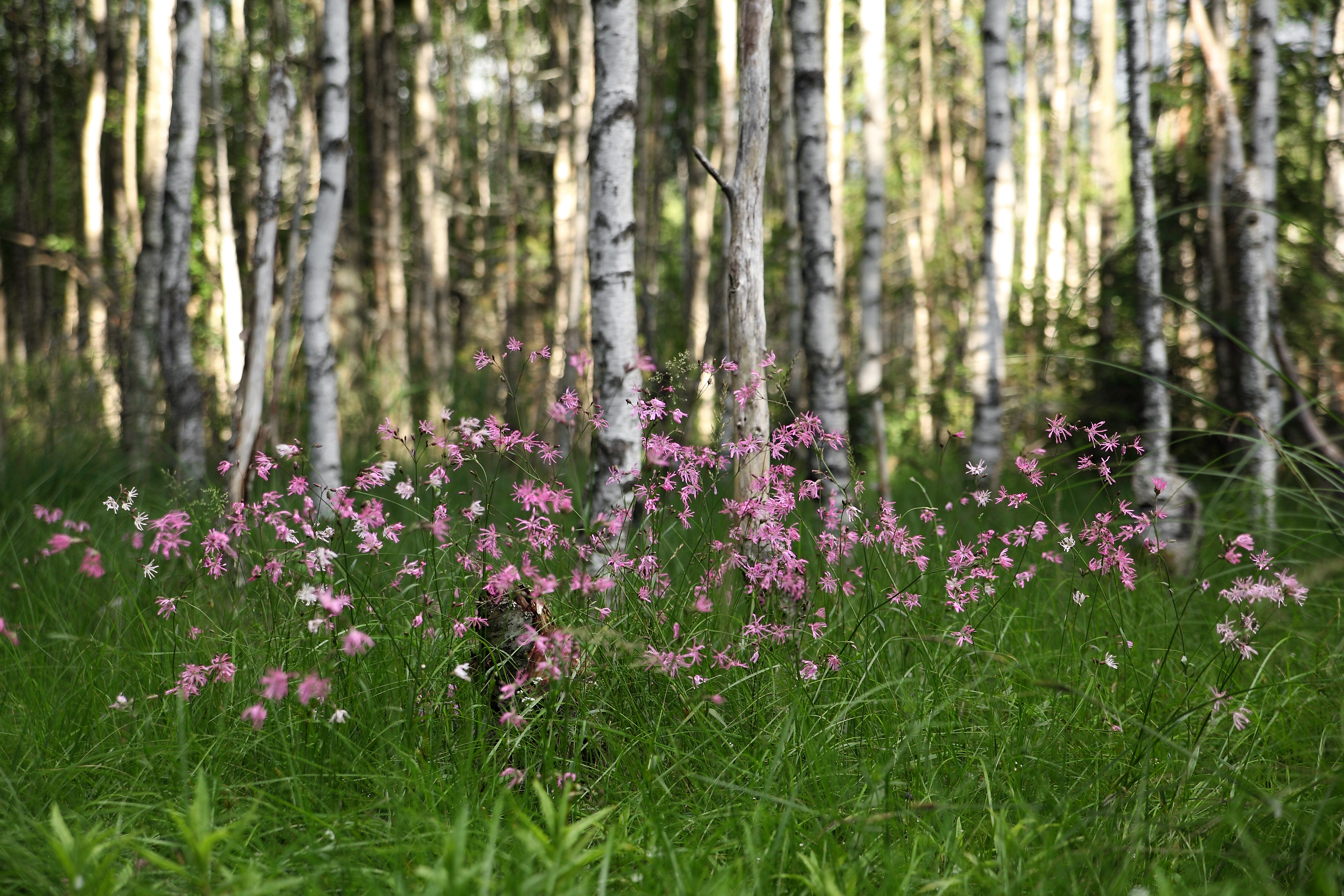
A population of ragged robin in Estonia

Butterflies and long-tongued bees feed on the flowers' nectar. In addition to these pollinators, the flowers are visited by many types of insects, and can be characterized by a generalized pollination syndrome.

In Britain it has declined in numbers because of modern farming techniques and draining of wet-lands and is no longer common.

== Cultivation ==
Popular garden cultivars include:

- 'Alba' – white-flowered form
- Jenny = 'Lychjen'
- 'Nana' – dwarf form (4 inches) with smaller leaf rosettes and shorter flower stems
- 'Petite Jenny'
- 'White Robin'
