= Michael Pfeiffer =

Michael Pfeiffer may refer to:

- Michael Pfeiffer (footballer) (1925–2018), German football player and manager
- Michael Traugott Pfeiffer (1771–1849), Swiss music pedagogue
- Michael David Pfeifer (born 1937), American prelate of the Roman Catholic Church

== See also ==
- Michael Peifer (born 1968), member of the Pennsylvania House of Representatives
- Michelle Pfeiffer, American actress
