= Ida Hilfiker-Schmid =

Swiss physician and women's rights activist

- Born: Ida Dorothea Schmid; 12 September 1866; Winterthur, Switzerland
- Died: 29 June 1951 (aged 84); Oberwil im Simmental, Switzerland
- Occupations: Gynecologist, pediatrician
- Known for: Founding the Mütterheim (later Inselhof), women's rights activism
- Spouse: Jakob Hilfiker
- Children: 2 sons

Ida Hilfiker-Schmid (12 September 1866 – 29 June 1951) was a Swiss gynecologist and pediatrician, founder and director of the institution that became the Inselhof in Zurich, and an activist for the improvement of the social and legal status of women.

== Early life and education ==
Ida Schmid was the daughter of Jakob Schmid, a Zurich merchant, and Anna Dorothea née Fenner. Little is known about her childhood and youth. From 1882 to 1886, she attended the teacher training school for female teachers in Zurich, where she became acquainted with Jenny Koller, Pauline Gottschall, and Josephine Zürcher, with whom she maintained lifelong friendships.

She was one of the first Swiss women to study medicine at the University of Zurich, beginning in 1887 and completing her state examination in 1892. After a brief period in Paris in 1893, probably as an assistant physician in a hospital, she returned to Zurich the same year and opened her first practice at her parents' home. In 1895, Schmid moved into her own apartment where she established her medical practice and obtained her doctorate under the supervision of Theodor Wyder with a thesis titled Über Prolapsoperationen der Zürcher Frauenklinik aus den Jahren 1888-1891 (On prolapse operations at the Zurich Women's Clinic from the years 1888-1891). In 1896, she married Jakob Hilfiker, an astronomer and geodesist, with whom she had two sons.

== Career and activism ==
From her youth, Hilfiker-Schmid was engaged in the women's movement and the women's suffrage cause. From 1896 to 1914, she held leadership positions intermittently within the Union für Frauenbestrebungen (Union for the Advancement of Women's Causes). In addition to her private practice, she worked in various public welfare organizations and was closely associated with the Schweizerische Pflegerinnenschule (Swiss School of Nursing with attached maternity ward) founded by Anna Heer. She was one of the initiators in 1908 of the Stadtzürcherischer Verein für Frauen-, Mutter- und Säuglingsschutz (Zurich City Association for the Protection of Women, Mothers and Infants, later Verein für Mutter- und Säuglingsschutz). The Verein Mütterheim that she established played an essential role in addressing the living conditions of unmarried pregnant women and offered them shelter, medical care, and social assistance before, during, and after the birth of their child in the Mütterheim (mothers' home) opened in 1911.

In addition to her profession, Hilfiker-Schmid distinguished herself as a lecturer and author. Her presentations, mainly published in Frauenbestrebungen, the organ of the Union for the Advancement of Women's Causes, illustrated her medical knowledge, experiences and sociopolitical ideas as well as her humanist and democratic worldview. She was also concerned with the fate of people despised by society, unmarried mothers and their children, the high infant mortality rate, and prostitutes (dangers encountered, risks of contagion of sexually transmitted infections). Advocating for concrete assistance rather than preconceived ideas and sanctions, she publicly took a position against eugenic theories and measures.

== Legacy ==
Hilfiker-Schmid, who remained professionally active until an advanced age, was widely renowned as a physician and activist for women's rights. She encouraged the creation and development of social institutions in Zurich through her initiatives in women-led associations, organizations, and institutions, and was involved in the professional training and volunteer work of women. She engaged with the social question of endemic poverty in cities, which she combated. The Mütterheim that she founded and successfully directed continued to exist into the 21st century under the name Inselhof. Her non-judgmental approach to prostitutes, unmarried mothers and their children contrasted sharply with the hygienist and eugenicist discourse widespread in politics, medicine, and psychiatry.

== Selected works ==
- Über Prolapsoperationen der Zürcher Frauenklinik aus den Jahren 1888-1891 (1895)
- "Das Frauenstudium", in: Die Frauenbewegung in der Schweiz. Sechs Vorträge veranstaltet durch die Pestalozzigesellschaft (1902), pp. 47-66
- "Gemeinsamer Unterricht beider Geschlechter", in: Zeitschrift für Schulgesundheitspflege, 17 (1904), pp. 126-127
- "Weibliches Dienstjahr", in: Frauenbestrebungen, 1909/12, pp. 89-92
- "Mutterpflege und Mutterschutz", in: Frauenbestrebungen, 1910/6, pp. 41-43 (part 1); 1910/7, pp. 49-52 (part 2)
- "Ein Mütterheim in Zürich", in: Frauenbestrebungen, 1911/7, pp. 49-52
- "Die Prostitution vom medizinischen Standpunkt aus", in: Zur Prostitutionsfrage. 3 Vorträge gehalten in Zürich (1912), pp. 3-18

== Bibliography ==
- Nägele, Verena: Himmelblau und Rosarot. Vom Haus für gefallene Mädchen zum Sozial-Medizinischen Zentrum für Frau, Mutter und Kind (2004)
- Fiereder, Elisabeth: Von der Kinderschutzvereinigung Zürich zum Stadtzürcherischen Verein für Mutter- und Säuglingsschutz. Zur Vorgeschichte und Entwicklung der Mütterberatung in der Stadt Zürich im Kontext erster Konstituierung moderner Wohlfahrt und Jugendhilfe, master's thesis, University of Zurich (2009)
- Thomann Tewarson, Heidi: Die ersten Zürcher Ärztinnen. Humanitäres Engagement und wissenschaftliche Arbeit zur Zeit der Eugenik (2018)
- Ammann, Ruth: Berufung zum Engagement? Die Genossenschafterin und religiöse Sozialistin Dora Staudinger (1886-1964) (2020), pp. 384-385
