= STS Media =

STS Media may refer to:

- STS (TV channel), a Russian TV network
- CTC Media, a Russian independent broadcasting company
- STS Media, Inc., a Los Angeles-based company headed by Stephen Stokols
