= Stephen Stokols =

- Citizenship: American
- Education: University of California, Berkeley; London Business School
- Occupations: Entrepreneur, investor
- Title: CEO of Boost Mobile

Stephen Stokols is an American entrepreneur, technologist, and executive located in Los Angeles, California. Stokols is CEO of Boost Mobile, which has over 9 millions subscribers and $4 billion in annual revenue. Prior to Boost, Stokols was the CEO of FreedomPop, the company he co-founded in August 2012 with Skype founder Niklas Zennström. FreedomPop was sold in June 2019.

In October 2019, Stokols helped launch XvsX Sports, a sport technology company, with former NBA Champion Metta World Peace, aiming to open access to premium pick-up games at underutilized indoor courts across the US. He also partnered with Metta World Peace on a $1 billion investment fund, where Stokols is an advisor.

In November 2019, Stokols joined forces with Liquide Inc. to raise $1 billion to bring high-speed wireless access to Africa. In May 2022, Stokols officially joined venture-backed BuildOps on its board of directors.

== Education and honors ==
Stokols received his MBA from UC Berkeley, Haas School of Business in 2002. During this time, Stokols attained two significant fellowships: Haas Venture Capital Fellowship in 2001 and the Price Center Fellowship in 2000. Stokols then attended the London Business School from where he received his Masters of Finance degree in 2007.

Stokols received the Wireless Week Leadership award in 2014.

== Career ==
As CEO of FreedomPop, Stokols raised over $109 million in venture capital and grew the company to over 100 employees. In 2015, Stokols expanded FreedomPop's free mobile service internationally.

In early 2016, Stokols closed a $50 million Series C financing for FreedomPop and launched a Global Hotspot with free mobile data in over 25 countries. In 2017, Stokols turned down a merger and acquisition offer for FreedomPop, worth as much as $450 million.

Before FreedomPop, Stokols was the CEO of Woo Media, until its sale to Zoosk in November 2011. The idea for Woo Media was spurred by his sister's experience with speed dating. Stokols immediately saw an opportunity for an online speed dating website leveraging new web based video technologies and created WooMe. Over four years, Stokols grew Woo Media into an online media group, incorporating several online communication channels. Under his leadership, Stokols grew Woo Media to over 10 million users until it was sold to Zoosk in 2011.

Prior to the creation of Woo Media, Stokols represented the BT Group as BT's Vice President of Strategy and Business Development in London. Before moving to BT Group, Stokols was the Director of Commerce at Qwest Communications. Stokols also worked for CMGI where he focused on positioning AltaVista for its sale to Yahoo!. Stokols is also a member of the Founders Pledge.

Stephen is also an active investor in technology companies, including villiger where he teamed up with actor Walton Goggins. Stokols was featured on CNBC’s Making a Millionaire, where he invested in Lego startup Brickhole.

FreedomPop was sold in June 2019.

On September 22, 2020, Stokols became Chief Executive of Boost Mobile. Under his leadership, Boost Mobile has expanded more widely into the digital area, including launching a loyalty program in 2022. Stokols also introduced healthcare services for Boost, becoming the first wireless provider to offer telemedicine services to its subscribers.

Under Stokols' leadership, Boost also became the first national company to sign an NIL athlete in 2021.
