= Dachverband Schweizerischer Gemeinnütziger Frauen =

Swiss women's organization founded in 1888

Dachverband Schweizerischer Gemeinnütziger Frauen (SGF)
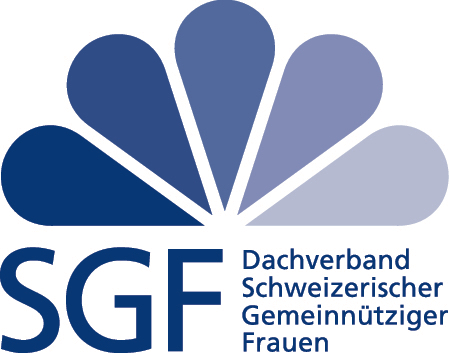
- Formation: 1888
- Founder: Emma Boos-Jegher, Emma Coradi-Stahl, Rosina Gschwind-Hofer
- Type: Umbrella organization
- Purpose: Women's charitable work, household education, social welfare
- Headquarters: Lenzburg
- Region served: Switzerland
- Members: ~30,000 (2021)
- Co-President: Jana Fehrensen
- Formerly called: Schweizerischer Gemeinnütziger Frauenverein

The Dachverband Schweizerischer Gemeinnütziger Frauen (SGF, "Umbrella organization of Swiss women in charitable work") formerly known as Schweizerischer Gemeinnütziger Frauenverein (SGF, "Swiss Charitable Women's Association"), is a women's organization in Switzerland, founded in 1888. As of 2021, it has approximately 30,000 members organized in 136 affiliated associations.

The organization became the first permanent, national umbrella organization for the Swiss women's movement, networking charitable women's organizations from German-speaking and Romansh-speaking regions of Switzerland. The SGF has historically focused on the professionalization of women's work in areas such as housework, health care, and gardening, while also serving as a liaison body with political authorities on welfare and educational issues.

== History ==
=== Foundation and early development ===
The organization was founded as the Schweizerischer Gemeinnütziger Frauenverein by Emma Boos-Jegher, Emma Coradi-Stahl and Rosina Gschwind-Hofer, who had left the Schweizer Frauen-Verband. The SGF aimed for the professionalization of women's work in areas they considered traditionally feminine, including housework, health care and gardening. The organization's strategy was to first educate women and then help them find employment to make them productive members of society.

Under the leadership of founding members Emma Coradi-Stahl and Gertrud Villiger-Keller, the organization established its headquarters in Lenzburg and grew to become the largest and most influential women's umbrella organization in Switzerland around 1900, connecting charitable women's organizations from German-speaking Switzerland and Romansh-speaking regions. In 1893, the SGF joined the Swiss Public Welfare Society (SGG) and became a collective member of the Swiss Red Cross in 1894, undertaking welfare tasks for soldiers on behalf of the Red Cross.

The organization positioned itself as a liaison body with political authorities in the areas of welfare and girls' education. While it distinguished itself from equality-oriented women's associations and therefore did not join the Federation of Swiss Women's Associations (BSF), it supported joint ventures such as the Saffa in 1928.

=== Educational and institutional development ===
For their professionalization goals, the SGF built a hospital and schools which first received cantonal subsidies and from 1895 onwards also from the state due a law on the education of the women. For the subsidies for their nursery school, the SGF reached an agreement with the Swiss army and the Red Cross according to which two thirds of the students would be involved in either of the two organization in the event of a war.

The SGF played a significant role in establishing local domestic service and household management schools and advocated for the creation of household teacher training seminars in Bern and Zürich. The organization supported the establishment of the Swiss Nurses' School with an affiliated women's hospital in Zürich, which opened in 1901 and was initiated by physicians Anna Heer and Marie Heim-Vögtlin. As an umbrella organization, the SGF founded the Horticultural School for Daughters in Niederlenz in 1906.

In 1908, the SGF was among the main initiators of the Swiss Association for Child and Women's Protection (Pro Juventute).

=== World War I ===
After the outbreak of World War I, the SGF was organizing the voluntary women's donations in addition to the war taxes meant as a compensation of the military service. Neither the Social Democrats or the Swiss Catholic Women's League (SKF) joined in. The SGF led the collection campaign for the National Women's Donation, which primarily served to finance soldier welfare programs. The campaign was successful and in a widely publicized ceremony of 1916, the SGF gave the Federal Council the sum of 1 Million Swiss Francs.

=== Mid-to-late 20th century developments ===
In 1957, the organization supported mandatory civil defense obligations for women. However, it only became actively involved in advocating for women's suffrage during the 1971 federal referendum. From 1993, the SGF endorsed time-limit solutions for abortion access.

=== Modern era and restructuring ===
In 2004, the organization changed its name to Dachverband Schweizerischer Gemeinnütziger Frauen and adopted the new motto "Solidary, Targeted, Progressive" to mark its changed socio-political objectives. Central themes continued to include public recognition of volunteer work and promotion of both public and private recognition of family work, with the addition of promoting women's equality in all areas of life.

Between 2010 and 2021, the number of sections declined from 265 to 136, and membership fell from 70,000 to approximately 30,000, roughly corresponding to the organization's founding-era size. Training courses were discontinued, and the area of the former horticultural school was sold to the municipality of Niederlenz.

The organization showed renewed momentum through its participation in the second nationwide women's strike in 2019 and with the election of new co-president Jana Fehrensen as the SGF representative to the Federal Commission for Women's Issues (EKF) in 2021. In autumn 2021, the SGF actively participated in the federal women's session. As an umbrella organization, it has continued to take positions on issues affecting women, such as the revision of occupational pension schemes and sexual criminal law.

== Publications ==
The SGF has maintained various publication organs throughout its history. From 1913 to 1994, it published the Zentralblatt des Schweizerischen Gemeinnützigen Frauenvereins (Central Gazette of the Swiss Charitable Women's Association). This was succeeded by Ideelle. Schweizerischer Gemeinnütziger Frauenverein (SGF) from 1994 to 2013, which was then replaced by the online publication SGF Aktuell in 2014.
