= Villinger =

Villinger is a German surname. Notable people with the surname include:

- Alexander Villinger (born 1953), German composer
- Bernhard Villinger, (1889–1967), German sportsman and cinematograph
- Marie Villinger, (1860–1946), Swiss feminist
- Werner Villinger (1887–1961), German psychiatrist, neurologist, and eugenicist

== See also ==
- Villiger, people with this surname
- Fillinger, people with this surname
