= Stiftung Grünau =

Foundation in Canton of Zurich, Switzerland

- Predecessor: Industrielle Anstalt für katholische Mädchen in Richterswil
- Formation: 1967 (as Stiftung Grünau); 1881 (as predecessor institution)
- Founder: Caspar Appenzeller (predecessor)
- Type: Foundation
- Legal status: Active
- Purpose: Professional integration of young people
- Headquarters: Richterswil, Canton of Zurich, Switzerland
- Website: http://stiftunggruenau.ch
- Formerly called: Industrielle Anstalt für katholische Mädchen in Richterswil; Erziehungsanstalt für katholische Mädchen in Richterswil

Stiftung Grünau is a Swiss foundation based in Richterswil, Canton of Zurich, that focuses on the professional integration of young people. Since the 1990s, the foundation has dedicated itself to helping young adults transition into the workforce following a period of reconceptualization after 1987.

The foundation traces its origins to the Industrielle Anstalt für katholische Mädchen in Richterswil (Industrial Institution for Catholic Girls in Richterswil), a Catholic reform institution for girls and young women that operated from 1881 to 1987. Founded as a privately initiated institution in the Protestant canton, it served as an educational and correctional facility for females deemed "difficult to educate." The historical institution should not be confused with the Catholic orphanage that also existed in Richterswil from 1909 to 1962.

== History ==
=== Foundation and early years ===
The institution opened its doors in 1881 as part of the tradition of 19th-century poverty education and rescue institutions. It was established under the auspices of the Swiss Society for Public Utility (SGG) and led by industrialist and philanthropist Caspar Appenzeller, who at the time already operated three children's and youth homes. The main characteristic of these institutions was the integration of industrial work as an "educational tool."

The facility was housed in an early 19th-century factory building on Seestrasse at the edge of Richterswil. Due to space constraints, the institution was expanded in 1889 with a new factory building containing work halls on two floors. An associated agricultural operation served primarily for self-sufficiency through dairy production, pig farming, and vegetable cultivation. Until 1930, the residents largely managed this farm themselves, after which it was leased out. In 1960, an additional residential and domestic science school building was opened approximately one hundred meters south of the older facilities.

Until 1926, the institution operated on the principle of an "industrial home" as a work facility under secular leadership. In cooperation with local manufacturer Rudolf Zinggeler and his son Rudolf, the youth were required to work in industrial silk twisting operations, with their output contributing to the institution's financing. The economic problems caused by the loss of this income source, combined with allegations of mistreatment by former residents, led to a change in leadership and a reconceptualization of the institution.

=== Population ===
The institution accepted female adolescents and young women aged approximately 15 to 25 years who were considered "difficult to educate." Initially, the lower age limit was 13 years, corresponding to the end of compulsory schooling. Until World War I, the home housed between 70 and 90 residents; this number fell to about 30 during the crisis period until the early 1920s and then rose again to 70 to 80. From the end of the 1930s, occupancy continuously declined to 40 to 50 people and settled at about 20 following the institution's reconceptualization in the late 1960s until its closure.

The residents came from throughout Switzerland, primarily from German-speaking, Catholic-influenced cantons, but also from French-speaking Switzerland, Ticino, and neighboring foreign countries. Admissions occurred through juvenile courts, private initiative of guardians, and through administrative-official channels (administrative detention). Administrative admissions were the most frequent and accounted for up to three-quarters of all internments in the 1960s. It is also documented that the "Relief Work for the Children of the Country Road" of Pro Juventute sent youth from Yenish families to Richterswil from approximately 1930 until the 1960s.

=== Catholic period and transformation ===
From the mid-1920s, the institution came under the management of the Sisters of the Basel Katharina-Werk. Domestic work such as washing, ironing, sewing, apron-making, and garden work replaced industrial labor. The residents could now complete internal vocational training as dressmakers, seamstresses, pressers, or in home economics (from 1954). In the late 1960s, the institution's leadership replaced this limited offering with a "work year" that served to assess vocational aptitude. Instead of relying on the labor of residents, the institution increasingly financed itself through public funds. As an external sign of these changes, it was renamed Stiftung Grünau in 1967.

In 1977, the Katharina Sisters were replaced by secular leadership due to a lack of new recruits in the congregation. This leadership introduced a "career choice year" intended to provide young people access to a broader spectrum of professions. Following the trend of the 1970s toward new forms of care, a supervised external residential group was opened in 1979, initially in Wollerau, and from 1982 in Richterswil.

=== Closure ===
With the entry into force in 1986 of the new concept for social institutions in the canton of Zurich, subsidies for private institutions were eliminated, leading to the closure of the youth home in 1987. After a period of reconceptualization, Stiftung Grünau dedicated itself to the professional integration of young people from the 1990s onward.

== Bibliography ==
- Keller, Regula: Von der industriellen Anstalt für katholische Mädchen zur Stiftung «Grünau» in Richterswil 1881-1977. Historische Monographie einer sozialpädagogischen Institution, 1988.
- Alltag unter Zwang. Zwischen Anstaltsinternierung und Entlassung, 2019 (Veröffentlichungen der Unabhängigen Expertenkommission Administrative Versorgungen, 8).
