= Paulin Gschwind =

Swiss priest (1833–1914)

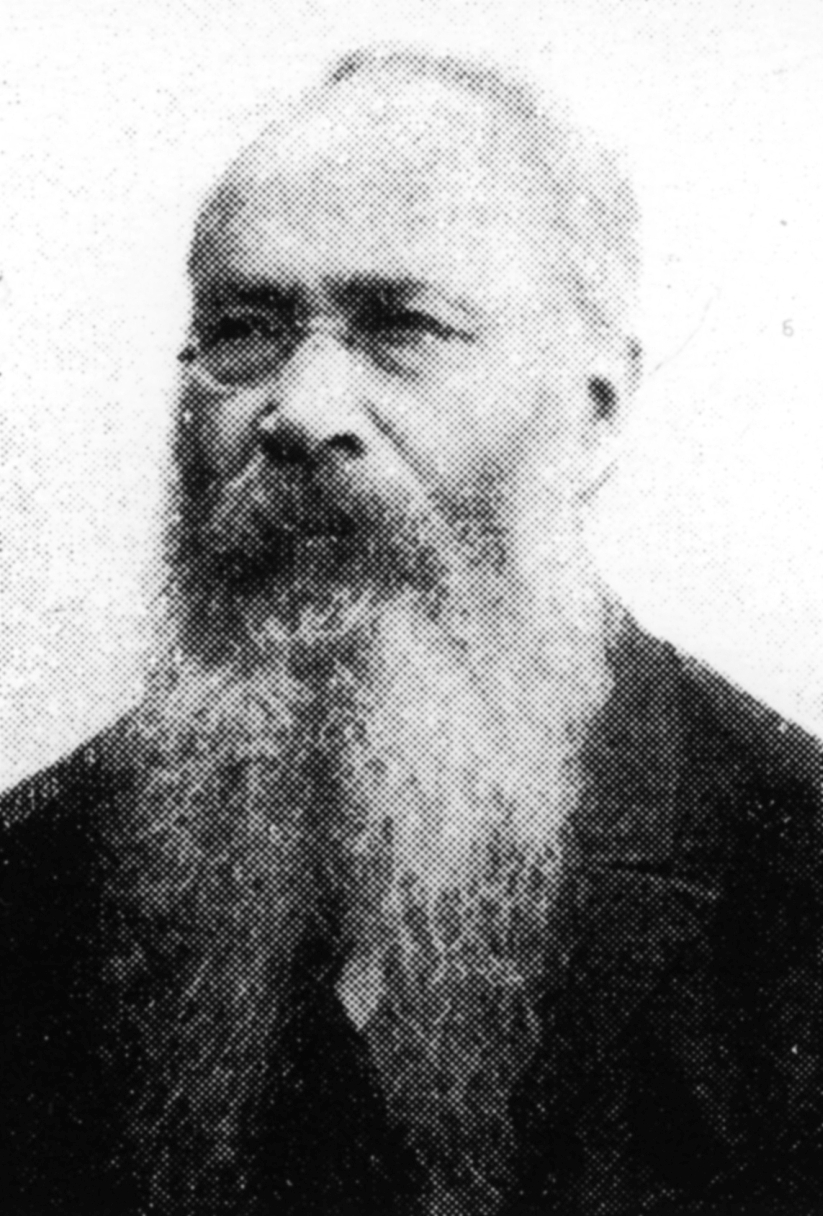
- Born: 22 December 1833; Therwil, Switzerland
- Died: 13 October 1914 (aged 80); Riehen, Switzerland
- Occupation: Priest
- Spouse: Rosina Gschwind-Hofer (m. 1876)
- Parents: Joseph Gschwind (father); Anna Gschwind (mother)

Paulin Gschwind (22 December 1833 – 13 October 1914) was a Swiss priest. His excommunication in 1872, after a conflict with the diocesan administration in Solothurn, became one of the triggers of the Kulturkampf in the Diocese of Basel and of the founding of the Christian Catholic Church of Switzerland. He was later parish priest in Kaiseraugst and episcopal vicar of Bishop Eduard Herzog.

== Biography ==
Paulin Gschwind was born in Therwil, the son of Joseph and Anna née Gschwind. From 1850 to 1857 he attended the monastery school at Mariastein, and from 1857 to 1860 he studied theology in Tübingen and Munich. In 1860 he obtained the federal Matura, and in 1861 he was ordained a priest in Solothurn. He was parish administrator (Pfarrverweser) in Ramiswil from 1862 to 1865 and parish priest in Starrkirch-Dulliken from 1865 to 1889.

Gschwind's increasingly polemical statements on the dogma of papal infallibility, on the reforms missed at the First Vatican Council and on celibacy led to a smoldering conflict with the diocesan administration (Ordinariat) in Solothurn and its chancellor, Josef Duret. The conflict ended in 1872 with Gschwind's excommunication. Because the government of the canton of Solothurn and his parish protected him in his office, the excommunication became one of the triggers of the Kulturkampf in the Diocese of Basel and of the founding of the Christian Catholic Church of Switzerland.

In 1876 Gschwind married Rosina Hofer. From 1887 to 1905 he was episcopal vicar of Bishop Eduard Herzog, and from 1889 to 1905 parish priest in Kaiseraugst. He died in Riehen in 1914.

== Works ==
- Geschichte der Entstehung der christkatholischen Kirche der Schweiz, 2 volumes, 1904–1910
- Peregrins Autobiographie, 1907

== Bibliography ==
- P. Stadler, Der Kulturkampf in der Schweiz, 2nd edition, 1996, 284–285
