= Pro Senectute =

Swiss foundation for the elderly

- Formation: 1917
- Type: Foundation
- Headquarters: Zurich
- Website: www.prosenectute.ch

Pro Senectute is a Swiss foundation for the elderly. It was founded in 1917 as the Schweizerische Stiftung für das Alter (Swiss Foundation for Old Age), a private relief organization, under the patronage of the Swiss Society for the Common Good. Soon after its founding it declared the creation of a national old-age insurance its main goal. In 1978 it was renamed Pro Senectute / Für das Alter.

== History ==
Under the patronage of the Swiss Society for the Common Good, a group of socially committed men founded the Swiss Foundation for Old Age (Schweizerische Stiftung für das Alter) in 1917 as a private relief organization (Hilfswerk). Its purpose was to help the elderly living in old people's homes (Asyle). Between 1918 and 1929 regional committees were set up in all cantons. The central secretariat was at first in Winterthur and moved to Zurich in 1920.

The foundation's assembly (Stiftungsversammlung) was always chaired by a serving or former member of the Federal Council: from 1918 to 1940 by Giuseppe Motta, until 1966 by Philipp Etter, until 1992 by Hans Peter Tschudi, and after that by the head of the Federal Department of Home Affairs. Since its founding the foundation has been financed by federal contributions, donations and bequests.

Soon after its founding, the foundation declared the creation of a national old-age insurance its main goal. After the introduction of the old-age and survivors' insurance (AHV), it continued to use its funds to relieve cases of hardship, but it expanded its services in many directions. In 1978 it changed its name to Pro Senectute / Für das Alter. In 1981 the organization shifted its emphasis to strengthening the self-confidence of the elderly, maintaining their physical and mental abilities, and their integration into society. Since the 1980s the foundation has increasingly issued specialist publications for the authorities and the public.

== Bibliography ==
- Chronik Pro Senectute, 2007
