= Herbarium vivum =

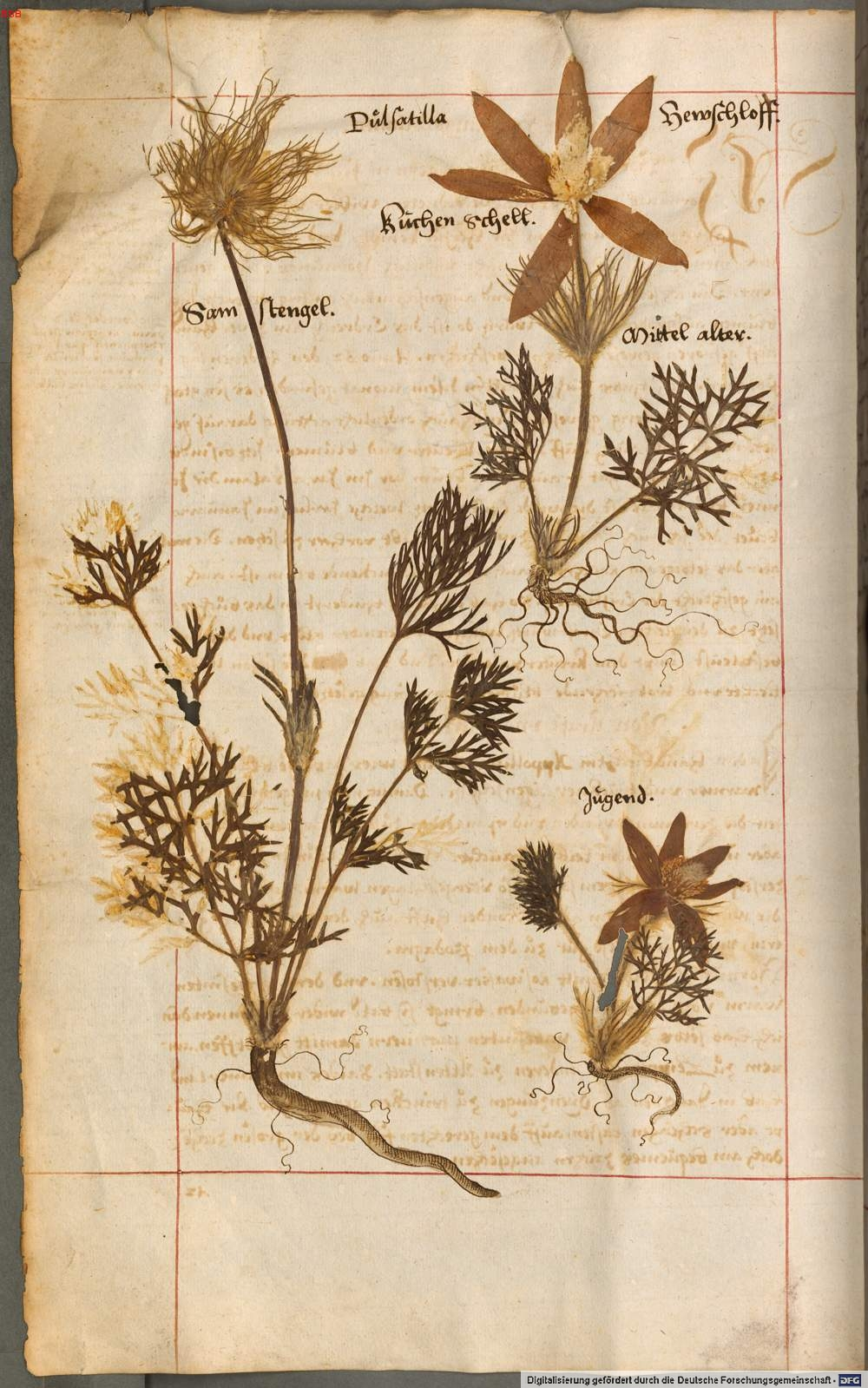
Page from Herbarium vivum compiled by Hieronymus Harder (1523-1607) in 1576

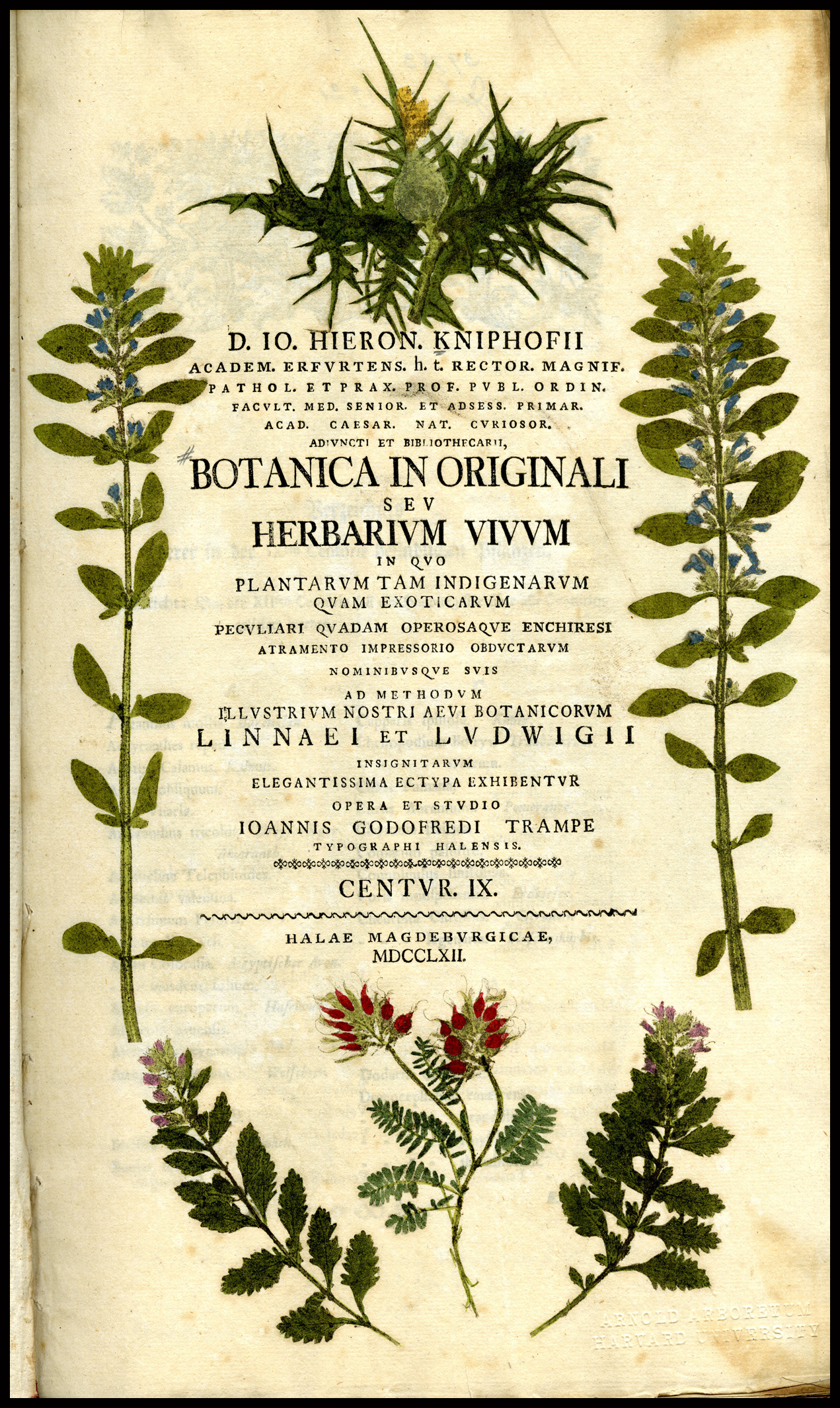
Title page of Herbarium vivum compiled by Johann Hieronymus Kniphof in 1759

A Herbarium vivum (plural Herbaria viva) is a collection of plants, called herbarium, and images, and their descriptions from a particular locality. The images were produced by a process doubtless suggested by engraving and lithography whereby an object coated with printer's ink or other suitable substance, is pressed onto paper, leaving behind an impression. An earlier method had used the lampblack derived from the sooty flame of a candle or lamp. The impression could then be painted over in colour with the certainty that form and size had been accurately fixed. The technique was adapted to circumstance, leading to mounting of dried plant material such as flowers, leaves or fruits, and supplemented by painting or sketching parts too bulky for pressing, so that a reasonable semblance of the complete plant could be formed.

Hieronymus Harder produced a Herbarium vivum in 12 volumes, the earliest dating to 1562. One of the volumes from 1576 is kept at the Bayerische Staatsbibliothek and is online here. Henrik Bernard Oldenland, a Cape Colony botanist assembled a Herbarium vivum of some 13 volumes which found their way into the possession of Johannes Burman, professor of botany in Amsterdam. Kniphof's 1759 Herbarium vivum comprised some 1200 botanical illustrations. In 1834 the astronomer John Herschel, facing a similar problem of accurately delineating, used a camera lucida to pencil in the outlines of Cape Colony plants while his wife Margaret then painted in the details.
