= Fillinger =

Fillinger is a surname. Notable people with the surname include:

- Mario Fillinger (born 1984), German former footballer
- Selina Fillinger (born 1994), American playwright, TV writer, and screenwriter
- Van Fillinger, American football player

== See also ==
- Fierlinger, people with this surname
- Villinger, people with this surname
