= Canaan Partners =

American venture capital firm

Canaan Management, LLC
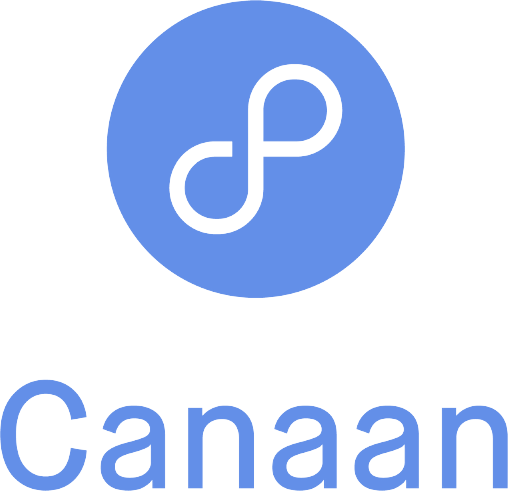
- Trade name: Canaan Partners
- Type: Private
- Industry: Venture Capital
- Predecessor: GE Venture Capital
- Founded: 1987; 39 years ago
- Founders: Harry Rein; Eric Young
- Headquarters: Stamford, Connecticut, U.S.
- AUM: US$6.8 billion (April 2023)
- Website: www.canaan.com

Canaan Partners, LLC (Canaan) is an American venture capital firm headquartered in Stamford, Connecticut with offices in San Francisco, Menlo Park and New York City. The firm focuses on investing in early stage companies in the technology and healthcare industries. Since 2014, the firm has also been investing in technology companies based in Israel.

== Background ==
In 1987, Harry Rein, Eric Young and several other employees at the venture capital unit of General Electric performed a management buyout to spin out the unit as an independent firm. The firm was subsequently named Canaan Partners and would be based in Westport, Connecticut.

In 2003, Rein left Canaan for a position with Foundation Medical Partners.

Towards the end of 2013, the firm established Canaan Partners Israel in Tel Aviv which would manage a $30 million fund to invest in Israeli technology companies. The fund would be managed independently of its American counterpart.

In 2018, the firm unveiled a program named Canaan Beta where it sets aside part of its latest fund to its youngest employees to manage. In 2017, $20 million was allocated to two of its youngest employees.

Canaan primarily invests in the technology and healthcare sectors. It allocates 60% of its capital to technology investments and 40% to healthcare investments. On average its investments are $15–20 million per company. Notable investments include Ebates, Instacart, LendingClub, The RealReal, Turo and Zoosk.

Compared to peer VC firms, Canaan invests in more female-managed companies. 40% of its investment team are women, four times the industry average.
