= 428 Monachia =

Main-belt asteroid

Discovery
- Discovered by: Walther Villiger
- Discovery date: 18 November 1897

Designations
- Pronunciation: /mɒˈneɪkiə/
- Named after: Munich
- Alternative designations: 1897 DK; 1946 UL; 1949 OE; 1953 TN3; 1974 XU
- Minor planet category: Main belt (Flora family)

Orbital characteristics
- Epoch 31 July 2016 (JD 2457600.5)
- Uncertainty parameter 0
- Observation arc: 117.50 yr (42917 d)
- Aphelion: 2.72087 AU (407.036 Gm)
- Perihelion: 1.89497 AU (283.483 Gm)
- Semi-major axis: 2.30792 AU (345.260 Gm)
- Eccentricity: 0.17893
- Orbital period (sidereal): 3.51 yr (1280.6 d)
- Mean anomaly: 327.639°
- Mean motion: 0° 16^{m} 51.989^{s} / day
- Inclination: 6.19903°
- Longitude of ascending node: 17.6267°
- Argument of perihelion: 15.4466°

Physical characteristics
- Dimensions: 17.65±1.3 km 18 km
- Synodic rotation period: 3.6342 ± 0.0002 h (0.1514250 ± 8.3×10^{−6} d)
- Geometric albedo: 0.1142±0.018, 0.114
- Absolute magnitude (H): 12.0

428 Monachia is an asteroid orbiting within the Flora family in the Main Belt.

It was discovered by Walther Villiger on 18 November 1897 in Munich, Germany. It was his only asteroid discovery. The asteroid's name comes from the Latin name for Munich.
