= Fierlinger =

Fierlinger is a surname. Notable people with the surname include:

- Paul Fierlinger (1936–2025), Czech-American animator and director
- Zdeněk Fierlinger (1891–1976), Czechoslovak diplomat and politician

== See also ==
- Fillinger, people with this surname
