= Rosina Gschwind-Hofer =

Swiss educator (1841–1904)

- Born: Maria Rosina Hofer; 3 February 1841; Biglen, Switzerland
- Died: 10 May 1904 (aged 63); Kaiseraugst, Switzerland
- Occupations: Teacher; school director
- Spouses: Rudolf Zeller (died 1875); Paulin Gschwind (m. 1876)
- Parents: Johann Hofer (father); Anna Moser (mother)

Rosina Gschwind-Hofer (born Maria Rosina Hofer; also Rosina Gschwind or Rosa Gschwind; 3 February 1841 – 10 May 1904) was a Swiss teacher. From 1885 she gave public lectures on nutrition. In 1888 she co-founded the Schweizerischer Gemeinnütziger Frauenverein (Swiss Charitable Women's Association), of which she was president in 1888–1889, and from 1890 until her death she ran the housekeeping school that she had founded in Kaiseraugst.

== Biography ==
Rosina Hofer was born in Biglen, the daughter of Johann Hofer, an innkeeper, and Anna née Moser. She began an apprenticeship as a milliner and then trained as a primary school teacher. From 1862 to 1866 she taught in Steffisburg and Thun. Her first husband, the merchant Rudolf Zeller, died in 1875. In 1876 she married Paulin Gschwind, a Christian Catholic priest; the marriage caused a stir.

From 1885 Gschwind-Hofer gave public lectures on questions of nutrition. In 1888 she co-founded the Schweizerischer Gemeinnütziger Frauenverein and was its president in 1888–1889. She took part in setting up the housekeeping school (Haushaltungsschule) in Buchs and the school for domestic servants (Dienstbotenschule) in Lenzburg. From 1890 to 1904 she ran the housekeeping school that she had founded in Kaiseraugst. From 1897 she was a member of the examination board of the training college for women teachers of housekeeping (Haushaltungslehrerinnenseminar) in Bern.

== Works ==
- 550 Kochrezepte, 5th edition, 1905

== Bibliography ==
- F. M. Huggenberg, Frauen dienen der Heimat, 1939, 5–30
- B. Traber, Bernerinnen, 1980, 71–75
