= Michael Traugott Pfeiffer =

German-Swiss pedagogue

Michael Traugott Pfeiffer (German: [ˈpfaɪfɐ] ) (November 5, 1771 - May 20, 1849) was a Swiss music pedagogue. Together with Hans Georg Nageli, they are considered pioneers of the Swiss choral movement at the beginning of the 19th century.

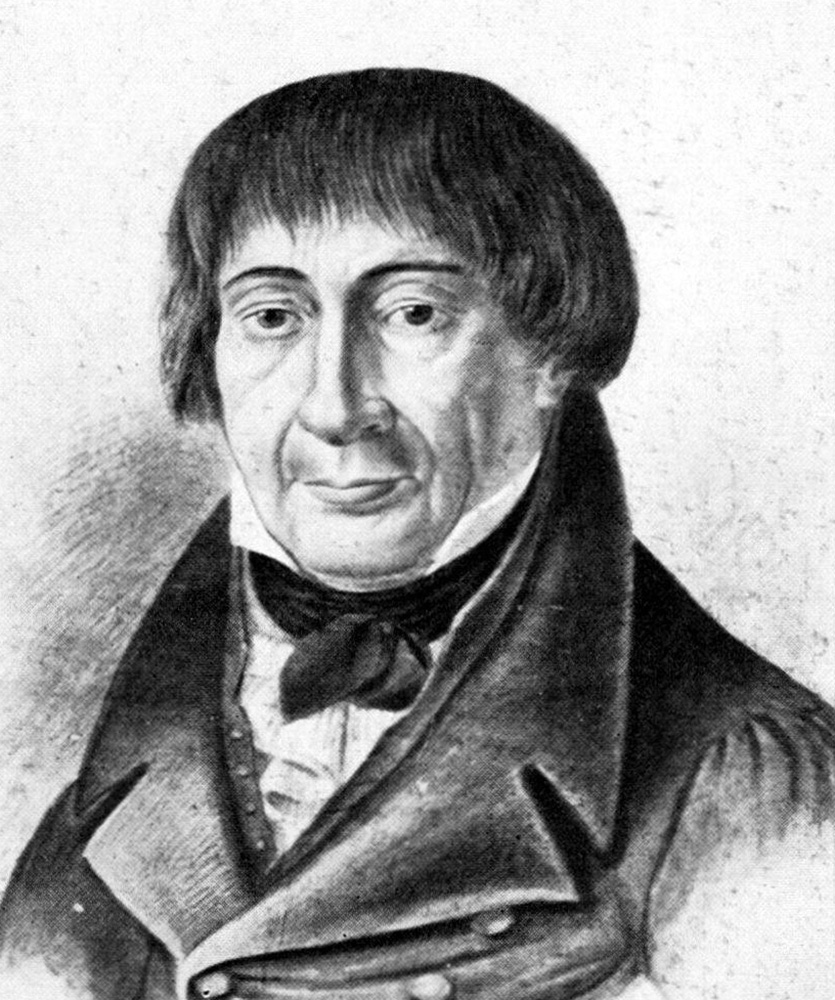
A drawing of Michael Traugott Pfeiffer (1771–1849). (from "Argovia", Volume 65, 1953)

== Biography ==
Pfeiffer was born November 5, 1771, in Wülfershausen as the son of a cantor and a teacher.

=== Solothurn ===
Pfeiffer attracted attention early on his life due to his musical talent. At the suggestion of the Franz Ludwig von Erthal, Pfeiffer started training to become his private secretary. Pfeiffer, however, decided to learn French in western Switzerland and first moved to Solothurn in 1792 to live with an aunt before settling in Sainte-Ursanne. The expansion of the ideas of the French Revolution to neighbouring Vaud, as well as an increased influx of French speakers to Solothurn as the siege of the French embassy to the Confederacy moved there, convinced him to find work in the city and use it as a base to learn foreign languages.

He then worked as a journalist in addition to teaching music and language.

After the death of his patron Erthal in 1795, Pfeiffer tried to gain a foothold in Morges and Geneva, but returned to Solothurn in 1800 where he worked for the Aargau cantonal administration for 3 years, reaching the title of secretary to the governor. During 1803, he attended a teaching course with Johann Heinrich Pestalozzi in Burgdorf and then he taught his methods at a private school.

He married Elisabetha Amiet from Solothurn. Their only child Josephine (born 1805) was married to the influential politician Augustin Keller.

During 1805, with the help of town school teacher Hieronymus Halder (with whom he completed his training in Burgdorf) Pfeiffer came to Lenzburg and founded a singing society and with the support of the local dean Johann Hünerwadel, a boarding school. Starting from 1808, he starter teaching advance students that belonged to German and Latin schools. He also led 2 summer courses where he taught and trained young teachers.

Due to the influence and tradition he built in Lenzburg, he was awarded a gold medal by the city in 1809.

=== His Relationship with Nägeli ===
Pfeiffer wrote down some compositions that belonged to his Zurich colleague Hans Georg Nageli. Together, Pfeiffer and Nägeli published a joint work in 1810 titled "Voice Education According to Pestalozzi Principles" as well as other follow-up works. In 1816 Pfeiffer received the Swiss citizenship.

=== Retirement and death ===
In 1846 his teacher training college took him to a secularized Wettingen monastery, where he retired and spent the rest of his life. He died on May 20, 1849.
