= Zoosk =

Online dating service

Zoosk, Inc.
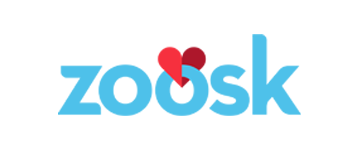
- Industry: Consumer services
- Predecessor: Woo Media
- Founded: Fremont, California, U.S. (2007)
- Founder: Alex Mehr; Shayan Zadeh; Brad Henrickson; John Smart
- Headquarters: Berlin, Germany
- Area served: Worldwide
- Services: Online dating service
- Revenue: ▲US$178.23 million (2013)
- Net income: ▲ −US$2.62 million (2013)
- Number of employees: 174 (April 2014)
- Website: zoosk.com

Zoosk is an online dating service available in 25 languages and in more than 80 countries. The founders of the company are Shayan Zadeh and Alex Mehr, who ran the company until December 2014. After struggles that year, Kelly Steckelberg became the company's new CEO. In July 2019, Zoosk became part of Spark Networks SE.

== History ==
Zoosk launched in December 2007. Its co-founders, Shayan Zadeh and Alex Mehr, were the company's original CEOs. They are both Iranian immigrants who migrated to US to continue their education. Zadeh and Mehr met as undergraduates at Sharif University of Technology in Iran and travelled to the US together to attend graduate school at the University of Maryland. Zadeh worked at Microsoft after graduating with a master's degree from University of Maryland in computer science, which is part of the University of Maryland College of Computer, Mathematical, and Natural Sciences. Mehr earned his master's degree and PhD and later worked for NASA. Mehr attended business school at the University of California at Berkeley, but he dropped out to work on Zoosk.

In April 2014, Zoosk filed S-1 paperwork for an initial public offering as it sought to raise $100 million in capital. In the S-1, the company reported 2013 revenues of $178.2 million, a 63% increase over the previous year, and that it had cut losses 87% to $2.6 million. It has 27 million members, of which 650,000 were paying subscribers, and its membership was growing 44% year-over-year. Zoosk had reached the position of no. 1 grossing dating app and a top 25 grossing app on the Apple iOS App Store.

Despite $200 million in revenue collected in 2014, as well as a profit the previous year, Zoosk lost money in 2014 due to the company overspending on expansion and over-hiring. The company operated on the start-up principle that profits do not matter. With these problems at the company, Zoosk canceled its IPO in December. In January 2015, they laid off 15% of their staff. To improve revenue, the company decided in November 2014 to require a paid membership to send messages.

On March 21, 2019, Spark Networks SE (a global dating company with a portfolio of dating brands) announced a definitive deal to acquire Zoosk. The deal was finalized on July 1, 2019, forming North America's second-largest dating company in revenues.

== Product ==
Zoosk has an iOS app and Android app app and a desktop chat client. Zoosk uses big data and algorithmic recommendations technology to help users find partners. Its "proprietary Behavioral Matchmaking engine" learns from users' clicks, messaging, and other actions to help produce more accurate matches. The idea is that the more data Zoosk obtains from its users, the better its recommendations can be.

In August 2014, Zoosk added its Photo Verification service, designed to prevent users from "posting photos of themselves when they were 10 years younger or 20 pounds lighter". To verify a photo, users are asked to take a video selfie in order to record their appearance from multiple angles. Zoosk moderators then determine if the user's profile photo and video match. When they do, the user receives a green check next to his or her photos. The feature was released first to the Zoosk iOS app, followed by Android.

In January 2018, Zoosk launched Insignia, a way for U.S. military service members to verify their status. The feature is meant to reduce instances of stolen valor, particularly in connection to romance scams.

Zoosk uses gamification and popularity rankings to encourage participation.

== Funding ==
Zoosk's investors include Bessemer Venture Partners, ATA Ventures and Canaan Partners. The company has raised more than $60 million in equity.

== Pricing model ==
Until November 2014, Zoosk charged no fee to start using the app and to send one message to another person. Since November 2014, contact and interaction beyond the first message per person requires a premium (i.e., paid) subscription.

== Awards and recognition ==
In 2014, Zoosk was named to the Inc. magazine's Inc. 5000 list of the fastest-growing private companies in America, ranking no. 1660.

In 2014, the San Francisco Business Times also named Shayan Zadeh to its 40 Under 40 list of Bay Area entrepreneurs.

The Wall Street Journal ranked Zoosk no. 29 on its The Next Big Thing 2011 – The Top 50 Venture-Funded Companies list, up from the No. 42 spot the previous year.

About.com's 2011 Reader's Choice Awards named Zoosk's iPhone app a finalist in its Best Dating App competition.

According to AppAppeal, in August 2012 Zoosk was the fifth most popular dating app in the world and the third in the U.S. In 2012, the company also won an Effie Award for its advertising campaign "Online Dating, Your Way".

== See also ==
- Comparison of online dating services
