= List of Skype features =

Features offered by the telecommunications application

Skype offered a number of features based around calling (both free and paid), messaging (including instant, voice and text messaging (SMS)), video chat, and file and screen sharing. The following is a partial list of Skype's features:

== Instant messaging and chat history ==
Skype allowed users to send instant messages to other users in their contact list. Messages sent to offline users were stored on Skype servers and would be delivered to their recipients as soon as they came online on Skype. Chat history along with the message status was synchronized across all user devices supported by Skype whenever the user signs in with the same Skype account. Skype allowed sending SMS messages, it was not possible to receive SMS messages on Skype so users needed a different way to receive responses to the messages they send using Skype.

=== Chat history ===
Skype keeps user instant messaging history on user's local computer, and on Skype's cloud for 30 days. Users cannot control how long their chat histories are stored on Skype's servers but can configure that option individually for every their device. Once user signs into Skype on a new device the conversation history is synced with Skype's cloud and stored locally. Skype allows users to remove or edit individual messages during one hour after sending; this affects messages already received by chat interlocutors as well as not delivered to them yet. Skype allows users to delete all saved conversation histories for the device.

=== Emoticons and formatting ===
Users can send about 254 emoticons that are displayed either statically or animated, depending on user's settings. There are also hidden emoticons, 241 flags and 63 other. On special occasions, Skype introduces featured emoticons that are later either left as standard (anger), left as hidden (mooning) or removed (captain). Sending an empty message is not possible. Automatic conversion of text into emoticons cannot be disabled.

Formatting text is possible: *text* creates bold text, _text_ creates italic text, {code} text {code} applies monospace font and ~text~ creates strikethrough text. Writing @@ at the beginning of a message will disable any formatting in the message. Placing two exclamation points and a space (!! ) at the beginning of a message will send the entire message in monospace font. A more convenient way to disable formatting for small pieces of text, is to use ```text``` instead of {code}text{code}. Turning off formatting permanently can be achieved with the command /wikimarkup off.

=== Quoting ===
Users are able to quote other messages by copying them and pasting them into a new message. A quote shows the message, the original sender, and the timestamp of the original message. The feature is seen as controversial and often useless because people have found ways to create custom quotes.

== Calls between Skype and landline / mobile phone numbers ==
Skype users can call landline and mobile phone numbers (previously known as SkypeOut) using Skype Credit or a calling subscription. Additionally, users can purchase a Skype Number (previously called SkypeIn and Online Number) that lets contacts call their Skype client from a landline or mobile phone.

=== Outgoing calls ===
The ability to call landline or mobile phones from Skype was originally branded as SkypeOut, but this term has been dropped in favor of Calls to mobiles and landlines. Skype users can call phone numbers, including landline and mobile phones, for a fee using prepaid Skype Credit or a subscription (see below). This fee can be as low as US$0.02 per minute for most developed countries, and as high as US$6.80 per minute for calls to the Inmarsat numbers.

In January 2007, Skype introduced a €0.03 connection fee for each call that connected to a landline or mobile number.

After 180 days of inactivity, a user's Skype Credit balance is deactivated; however, it can be reactivated.

==== Subscription calling plans ====
On 19 December 2006, Skype announced that there would be a new pricing structure in 2007. Details of a new scheme were released 18 January 2007. The initial press release was vague about the new scheme, but it did reveal that there may be a new connection fee.

In January 2007, Skype launched Skype Pro, a prepaid unlimited call subscription for calls that were made inside North America. Skype's unlimited calling offers unlimited calls to anyone, on any phone, within the U.S. and Canada, for a one-time (e.g. annual) fee. As of April 21, 2008, Skype Pro was replaced by new calling subscription plans, which don't require the calls to start from a certain country.

Skype offers several monthly plans that it calls unlimited. However, Skype limits these subscriptions to 10,000 minutes per month, 6 hours per day, and 50 telephone numbers per day. If one of these limits is exceeded, any additional calls are billed at regular rates and connection fees if the user has Skype Credit.

==== Skype To Go numbers ====
Users can set up a Skype To Go number which allows them to reach international phones numbers dialled from any landline or mobile. Skype provides a local number (the user chooses the area code) that then connects using Skype Credit to the number in another country. The service also provides the opportunity to dial any number abroad as well.

==== Toll-free numbers ====
Calls to most toll-free numbers in Australia (+61 1800), Austria (+43 800), Estonia (+372 800) France (+33 800, +33 801, +33 803, +33 805, +33 806, +33 808, +33 809), Germany (+49 800), the Netherlands (+31 800), Poland (+48 800), Spain (+34 900), Taiwan (+886 801, +886 811), the UK (+44 500, +44 800, +44 808), United Nations (+888) and the United States (+1 800, +1 822, +1 833, +1 844, +1 855, +1 866, +1 877, +1 888) are free for all Skype users.

Support for toll-free numbers in Canada was effectively removed in January 2012.

==== Emergency numbers ====
Skype also does not support calling emergency numbers such as 1-1-2 in Europe or 911 in the United States, however they do support this service in Australia, Denmark, Finland, and the United Kingdom.

==== Caller ID for outgoing calls ====
Skype offers a feature allowing users to set the caller ID for outgoing calls to telephone numbers. Set-up verification involves sending an SMS text message to a selected mobile phone number, then typing that verification code into a web form. Since most regular home and business telephones cannot receive text messages, this feature is only available to owners of mobile phones.

=== Incoming calls ===
==== Skype Number ====
Skype Number (formerly called Online Number and until 2010 named SkypeIn) allows a Skype user to receive calls to their Skype client (on whatever device) dialed from mobiles or landlines to a Skype-provided phone number. The number need not be in the same location as the user. For example, a user in San Francisco could create a local telephone number in London. Callers in London could then make a local call to reach that user (who answers on Skype in San Francisco).

Skype offers numbers in Australia, Chile, Denmark, Estonia, Finland, France, Germany, Hong Kong, Hungary, Ireland, Italy, Republic of Korea, Malta, Mexico, Netherlands, New Zealand, Poland, Romania, South Africa, Sweden, Switzerland, the United Kingdom, and the United States.

In Russia some companies, including SIP operators, provide direct numbers, redirecting calls to Skype.

== Skype Premium ==
Skype Premium originally bundled together a number of Skype's features including the selection of a calling subscription, the ability to make group video calls and the ability to screen share with up to 10 other people (person-to-person video calls are free), improved customer support and the removal of ads from the Skype client. However, the Premium product was removed in the summer of 2014 when group video calls and screen sharing were made free.

== Voicemail ==
Skype Voicemail (now called Voice messaging) was released on March 10, 2005. This service allows callers to leave voicemail messages for Skype users who are indisposed. Leaving voicemail messages became a free service in 2012.

== Video calling and screen sharing ==
Skype 2.0 and later, on Microsoft Windows (DirectX 9.0 or above required), Mac OS X, and Linux, supports video calling for Skype-to-Skype calls between two parties. Skype 3.6 and later on Windows and Skype 5.3 and later on Mac supports 720p high-definition video. Skype 5.8 and later on Windows and Skype 5.5 for Mac support 1080p high-definition video with the Logitech C920 webcam as well as the primary use of H.264 video codec instead of VP8 found in past versions. Skype 3.0.0 on iOS allows iPhone, iPad and iPod Touch users to call each other, as well as Windows, Linux and Mac OS X. Skype 5 supports group video calls. Sharing of external monitors is also supported via third party hardware.

In 2019, Skype added an option to blur the background using A.I. algorithms purely done using software, despite a depth sensing camera not being present in most webcams.

== SMS text messaging ==
Like many other instant messaging services, Skype clients can send SMS text messages to mobile phone numbers. In the United States, China, and Taiwan, Skype uses a "generic, pre-defined number" as the sender ID. In other countries, the message can be set to appear coming from a verified mobile number, allowing recipients to reply, or else show the first 11 characters of the Skype username. However, as of March 2015, Skype users cannot receive SMS, despite a continuing series of requests and complaints.

Costs are generally lower than standard SMS charges; for example Skype's UK rate per SMS message including VAT is 6.4p, compared to standard rates of 10p or 12p; for international SMS costs will be significantly cheaper using Skype.

== Wireless hotspot network access ==
Skype WiFi (previously called Skype Access) allows users to pay a per-minute charge for Internet access at commercial wireless hotspots using Skype Credit. As of May 2010, Skype lists more than 100 participating networks. This replaced an earlier feature Skype Zones Beta which provided subscription-based access at wireless hotspots operated by Boingo and The Cloud.

In February 2017, Microsoft announced plans to discontinue its Skype Wi-Fi service globally. The application was delisted, and the service itself no longer functioned after March 31, 2017.

== Application features ==
Skype Click to Call (formerly called the Skype Web Toolbar) recognizes phone and Skype Numbers, and is available for Internet Explorer, Google Chrome, and Mozilla Firefox on Windows. Such numbers on web pages are replaced with an icon that can be clicked to call the number using Skype, or right-clicked to provide further options, such as adding the number to Skype's list of contacts. The feature detects phone numbers automatically, but a web site developer can override the detection algorithm using a Meta element and mark the valid numbers individually.

A log file is created for each contact on a user's contact list. Log files are stored locally, meaning they are not available if a user switches computers. By default, the option to log conversations is disabled, but can be enabled in the tools / privacy panel.

On Windows, Skype can be run directly from a USB flash drive without being installed on the host computer. On Mac OS X, installation on the host computer is not required.

In December 2017, Microsoft added "Skype Interviews", a shared code editing system for those wishing to run job interviews for programming roles.

== Discontinued features ==
=== Skype chat ===
Skype supports group text chat with an interface similar to IRC with up to 150 people.

The Macintosh version used to use the same message view style format as Adium, though with a different filename extension. Message view styles made for Adium could be installed for Skype, and they did not even need to be renamed. There were a couple of cosmetic bugs, but ignoring those, Adium styles worked without modification. This feature is not present in the Windows, Linux, and Pocket PC versions of Skype. This feature has been discontinued starting with Skype 2.7.0.49.

=== Not Available status ===
Since Skype 4, the "Not Available" status is supported. This status was removed in Skype 5.

Most Skype versions, including version 4, broadcast a status of "Not Available" after a configured idle time, but Skype 4 no longer allows the user to edit this setting. The only way for the user to configure this idle time setting is to edit the IdleTimeForNA setting in the config.xml file. Since this feature was removed in Skype 5, the edit setting no longer exists in the config.xml file.

Skype 5 and above display other users' "Not Available" status as "Away".

=== SkypeMe! status ===
Skype let users set their presence indicator to "SkypeMe!" in earlier versions of Skype software. It invited calls from strangers. Setting one's status to SkypeMe! attracts a number of callers who want to practice a foreign language (usually English), in addition to the expected scammers and spammers. This feature has been hidden from being selectable starting with Skype version 4 and removed completely in version 5. Setting your privacy settings to "allow anyone to contact me" essentially does the same thing minus the presence indicator itself.

=== Skypecasts ===
Skypecasting was released on May 3, 2006. Skypecasts were live, moderated conversations allowing groups of up to 100 people to converse, moderated by the "host" who was able to control who was able to speak. The "host" would always remain in control, and could invite people into the speaking area. There was the functionality to mute and eject, both speakers and listeners, or add more people to speak from the listener section. Skypecasts did not support chat windows to share text information (such as URL) with participants. The Skypecast feature was removed in 2008.

=== Skype Prime ===
Skype Prime was a beta feature in Skype 3.1. It allowed users to call lines that charged a per minute rate usually for advice on a particular topic. The feature has since been discontinued in later versions of the Windows and Mac clients.

=== SkypeFind / business directory ===
SkypeFind was a community-generated directory of business reviews in Skype 3.1. The feature was removed Skype for Windows 4.x client. The business directory replaced SkypeFind but has also been discontinued from version 5.x of the Windows client.

=== Skype directory search ===
Earlier Skype versions allowed the user to search the Skype directory for random people to talk to. This feature was effectively discontinued since Skype 4.0. In current Skype releases you can only add contacts for which you know one of the following pieces of information: e-mail address, phone number, full name, or Skype name.

== See also ==
- Comparison of VoIP software
- Skype protocol
- Videoconferencing
- Voice over IP
