= Walter Augustin Villiger =

Swiss astronomer

Asteroids discovered: 1
428 Monachia	November 18, 1897	MPC

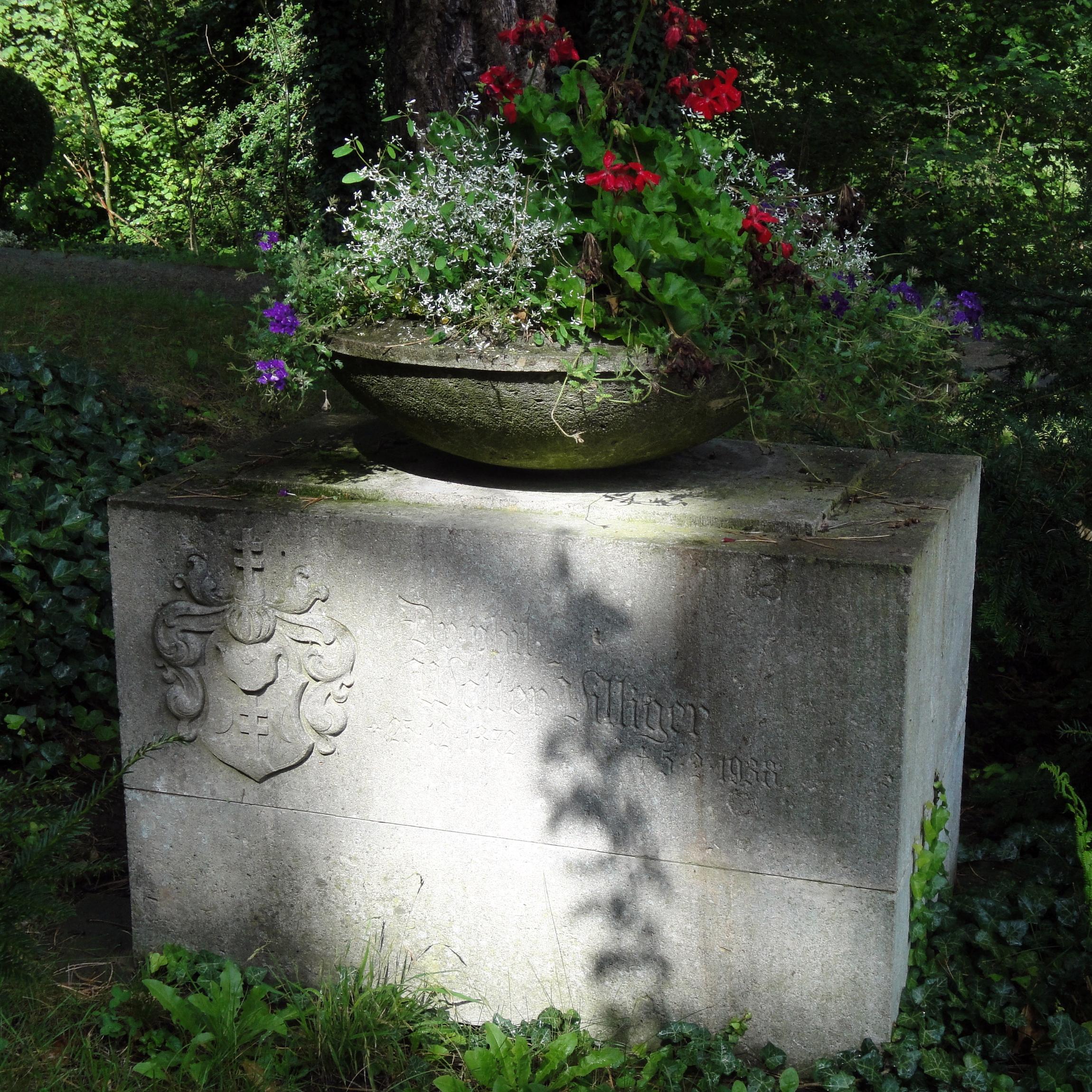
Grave in Jena

Walter Augustin Villiger (1872–1938; his first name is sometimes spelt Walther) was a Swiss astronomer and Carl Zeiss engineer who discovered an asteroid while working in Munich, Germany. He also participated in the observation of comets.

His astronomical period of activity extended from 1896 to 1907. In 1924, less than a year after the first planetarium had been opened at the Deutsches Museum in Munich, Walther Villiger suggested a new, improved Zeiss planetarium projector. This new Zeiss, known as the Mark II, was designed for much larger theatres than the previous model —up to 23 metres .

Asteroid 1310 Villigera is named after him.
