= Johann Hieronymus Kniphof =

German physician and botanist

Johann Hieronymus Kniphof (24 February 1704 in Erfurt – 23 January 1763) was a German physician and botanist.

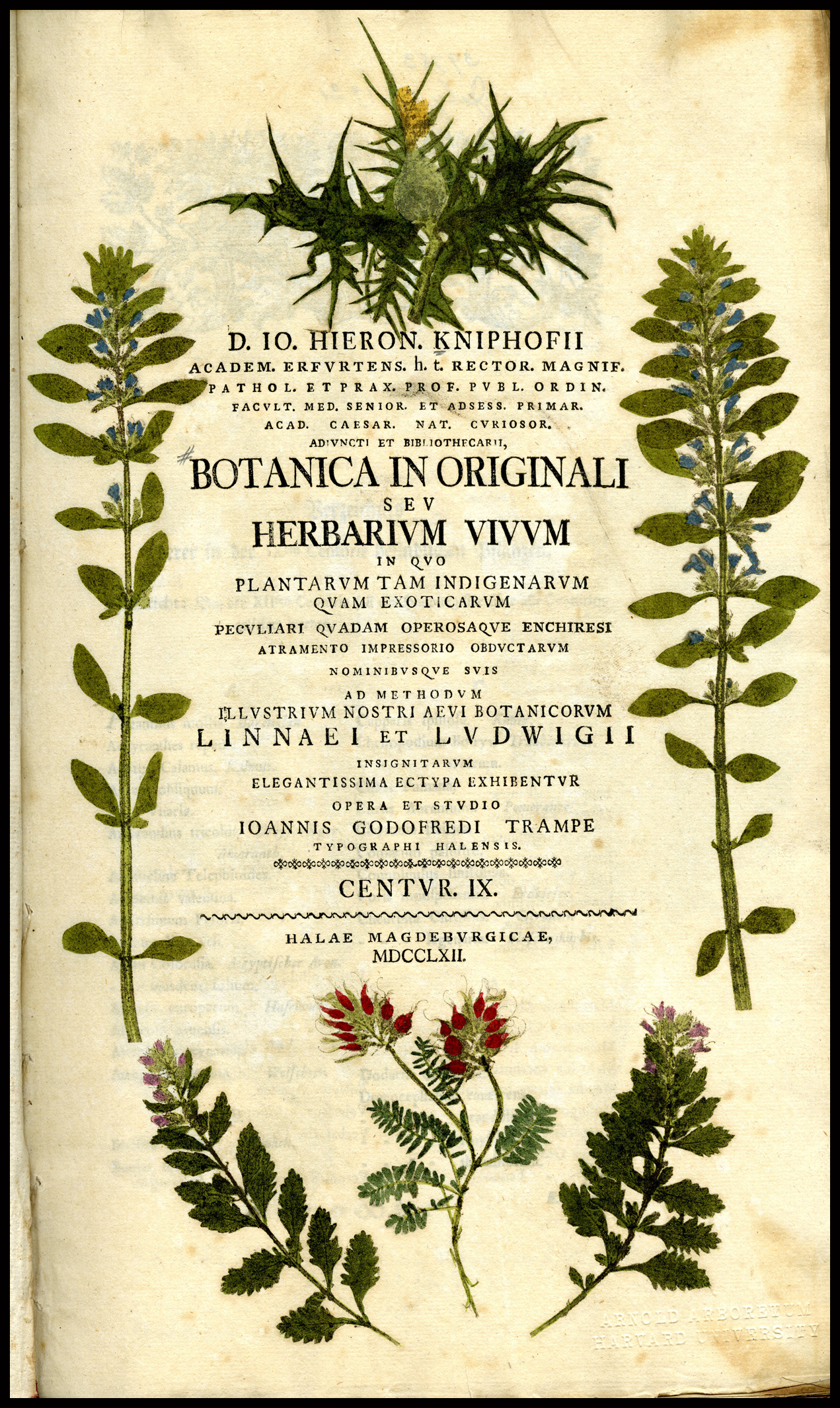
Kniphof's "Botanica in Originali, seu Herbarium Vivum" (1759)

He studied medicine at the Universities of Jena and Erfurt, becoming a professor of medicine at the latter institution in 1737. In 1745 he succeeded Andreas Elias Büchner (1701–1769) as director of the library at Erfurt, two years later being named dean to the faculty of medicine. In 1761 he was chosen as university rector.

At Erfurt, he assembled a large and impressive herbarium, about which in 1733, he first published a work with the title of "Botanica in originali" (later releases known as "Botanica in Originali, seu Herbarium Vivum"). Considered to be Kniphof's magnum opus, it would eventually be published in several editions. It was renowned for employing a preparation/printing technique known as "nature printing", which at the time was a little understood process that Kniphof had mastered in order to imprint details of various botanical specimens.

The botanical genus Kniphofia (family Asphodelaceae) was named in his honor by botanist Conrad Moench (1745–1805).

== See also ==
- Herbarium vivum
