= Emma Coradi-Stahl =

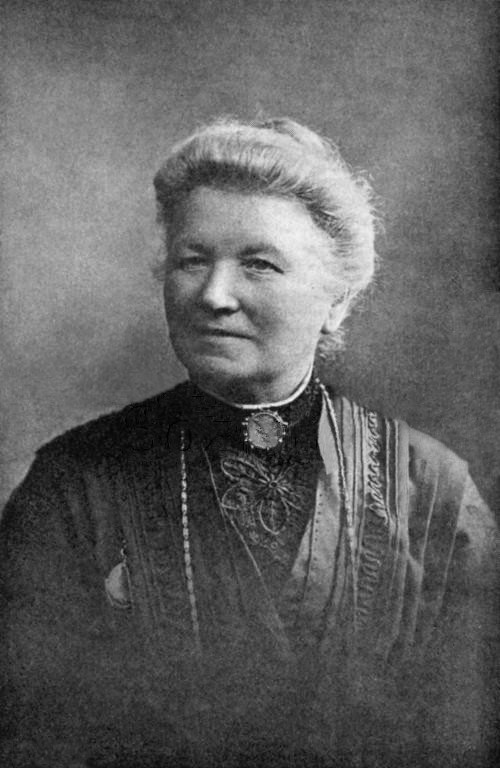
- Born: 9 November 1846; Sonnenberg, Hefenhofen, Thurgau, Switzerland
- Died: 8 April 1912 (aged 65); Zürich, Switzerland
- Occupation: Feminist

Emma Coradi-Stahl (9 November 1846 – 8 April 1912) was a Swiss feminist. She was one of the founders of the Schweizerische Gemeinnützige Frauenverein and an activist for the vocational training of young girls in Switzerland.

== Early life ==
Coradi was born on 9 November 1846 to Jakob Stahl. She grew up in Dozwil and received training in typical female work such as needlework and French.

== Career ==
In 1874, Coradi-Stahl opened a broderie business in Aarau. More than 10 years later, she joined the executive committee of the Switzerland Women's Association.

Coradi-Stahl was one of the founding members of the Schweizerische Gemeinnützige Frauenverein and was elected to the Board on 18 March 1888 as Vice-President. Before 1893, Coradi-Stahl and her husband moved to Zürich, where he accepted a position as a publisher. In Zurich, Coradi-Stahl served as the Schweizerische Gemeinnützige Frauenverein Director of the Zurich chapter from 1903 to 1908. Before this, she published an entitled "How Gritli learns to keep a house," which promoted vocational and home economics education for young women. After the death of Gertrud Villiger-Keller, Coradi served as president of the Schweizerische Gemeinnützige Frauenverein from 1908 to 1912. The goal of the Schweizerische Gemeinnützige Frauenverein was to find a solution to industrialization social problems. The non-profit organization chose Coradi-Stahl to be its first federal inspector of domestic economics. Coradi– Stahl, like her predecessors, advocated for woman has to learn professions, but keep their feminine nature. As a result, Coradi– Stahl spoke out against segregation between girls and boys in public school. She claimed that because poor and lower class women would not access secondary education, they needed to learn the necessary skills to be a good housewife. This required female only vocational schools. Coradi-Stahl then began to lecture across Europe on manual labor and petitioned for financial support for the further education of girls.
