= Hieronymus Harder =

German botanist (1523–1607)

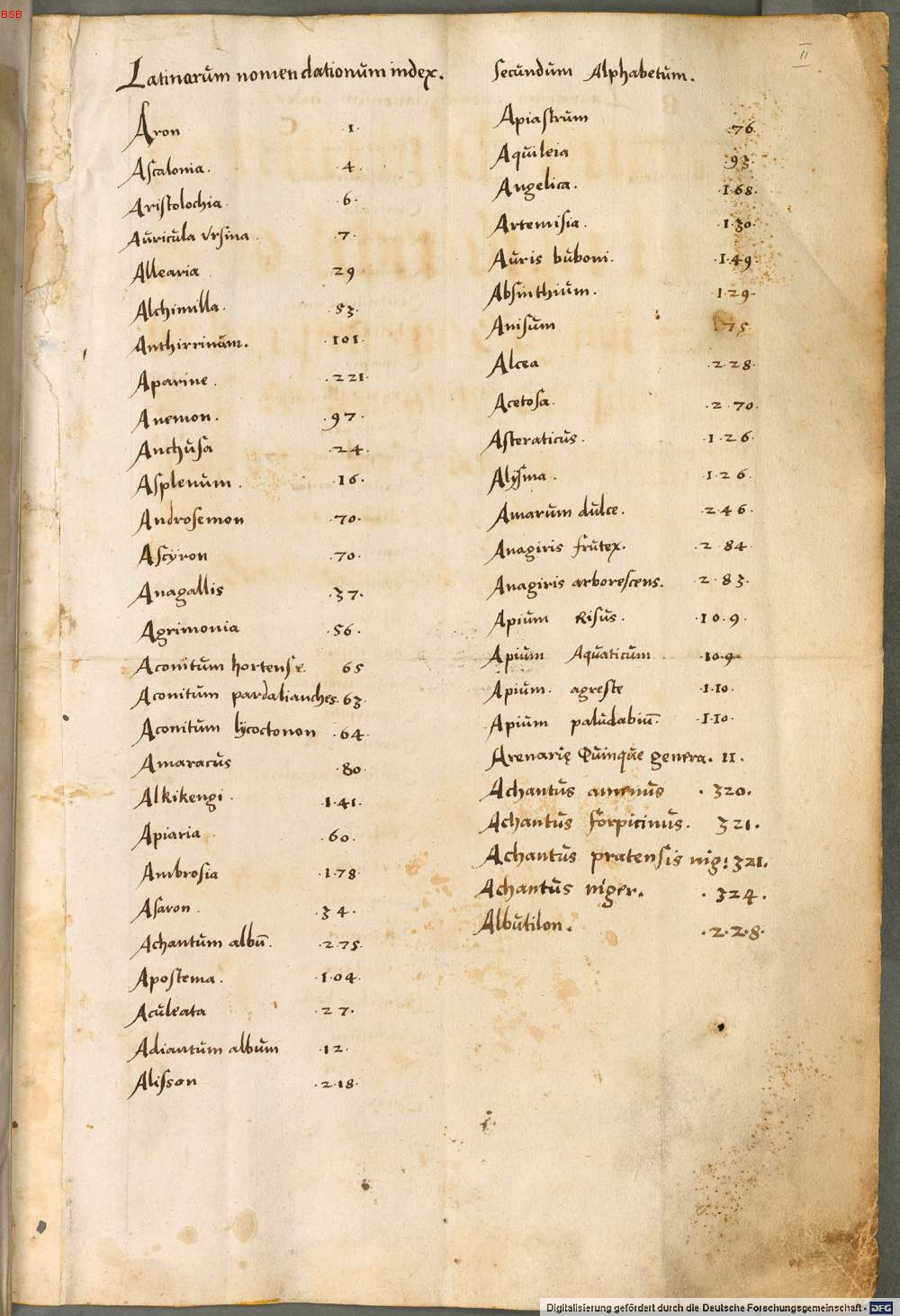
Page from index to Harder's Herbarium vivum showing his frequent use of generic name coupled to a descriptive second name

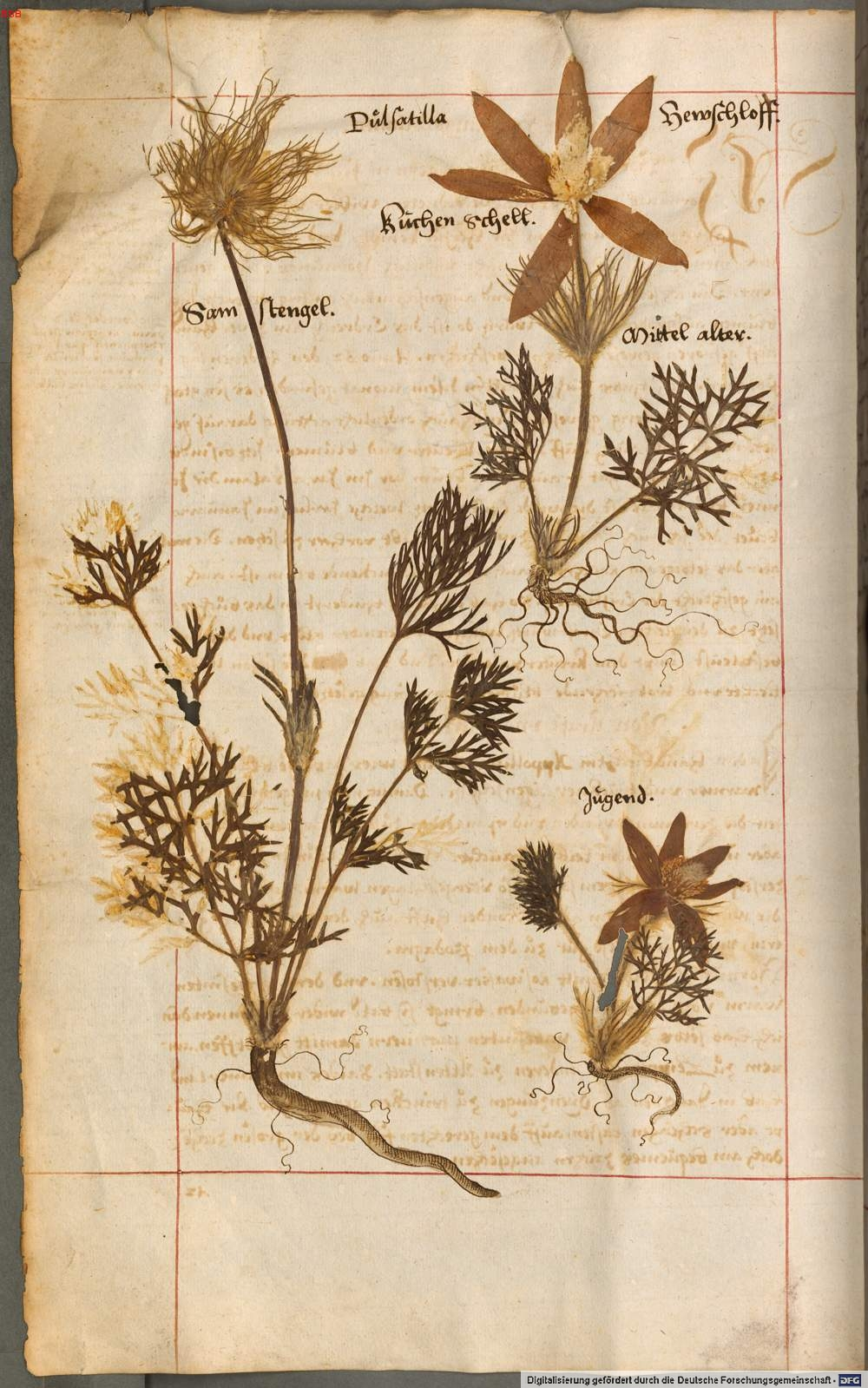

Hieronymus Harder (1523 – April 1607) was a German botanist and teacher of Latin.

Harder was born in Meersburg in the Lake Constance region of Germany, but part of his youth was spent in Bregenz, where his father taught from 1535 onwards. In 1560 Harder was examined in Ulm for the post of Latin Master and from 1561 taught at Geislingen an der Steige, and in 1571–72 in Bad Überkingen. From 1578 to shortly before his death he was Preceptor at the Latin school in Ulm, where he died.

Harder corresponded with the prominent Flemish botanist Carolus Clusius (Charles de l'Écluse), who supplied him with seeds and tubers of New World plants, including the tomato and tobacco that appear in several of his herbarium volumes as early as the 1570s.

When not involved in his teaching activities, Harder collected plants in the Swabian Alps and around Lake Constance. From 1562 he put together some twelve volumes of plant collections - these being some of the earliest of the type known as Herbarium vivum in which missing parts of the specimens are represented by coloured drawings. These he passed on to prominent officials, including Duke Albrecht of Bavaria, who gave him financial support and tenure of his post. Names were given in Latin and German, with detailed information added. In addition to wild flowering plants, Harder included mosses, ferns and horsetails, as well as crop plants, such as tomato and tobacco, which only a few decades earlier had been introduced to Germany from America. Eleven of the twelve volumes are known and are kept in Heidelberg (the oldest from 1562 and in private hands), München (1574, 1576), the Vatican (1574), Salzburg (1592), Ulm (1594), Vienna (1599), Linz (1599), Überlingen, Zürich (1592, 1594) and Lindau (1607).
