= Schweizer Frauen-Verband =

Schweizer Frauen-Verband was a women's organization in Switzerland, founded in 1885.

It was the first national women's organization in Switzerland, and as such played a pioneering role in the Swiss women's movement. However, inner conflicts caused it to be dissolved in 1888, and a fraction of it founded the Schweizerischen Gemeinnützigen Frauenverein (SGF).
