= Leonz Villiger =

Swiss politician (1811–1893)

- Born: 15 January 1811; Hünenberg, Zug, Switzerland
- Died: 15 March 1893 (aged 82); Cham, Zug, Switzerland
- Occupations: Farmer; politician
- Spouse: Rosa Villiger
- Parents: Leonz Villiger (father); Anna Maria Hildebrand (mother)
- Relatives: Gertrud Villiger-Keller (daughter-in-law)

Leonz Villiger (15 January 1811 – 15 March 1893) was a Swiss farmer and politician from Hünenberg in the canton of Zug. He was a liberal member of the Grand Council of Zug from 1848 to 1869, a judge of the high court from 1848 to 1854 and a member of the cantonal government from 1858 to 1865. From 1857 to 1865 he presided over the municipality of Hünenberg.

== Biography ==
Leonz Villiger was born on 15 January 1811 in Hünenberg, the son of Leonz Villiger, a farmer and member of the council (Ratsherr), and Anna Maria née Hildebrand. He married Rosa née Villiger, daughter of Joseph Villiger, a farmer. His son Fidel Villiger, a lawyer and politician, married Gertrud Keller in 1866.

Villiger was a farmer. In 1834–1835, 1844–1845 and 1847 he was a member of the cantonal council (Kantonsrat), then the executive of the canton of Zug, and in the years in between a member of the Landrat. In 1847–1848 he sat on the constitutional council (Verfassungsrat). From 1848 to 1869 he was a liberal member of the Grand Council (Grosser Rat), and from 1858 to 1865 he was a member of the cantonal government (Regierungsrat). From 1848 to 1854 he was a judge of the high court (Oberrichter).

From 1852 to 1856 Villiger was president of the corporation (Korporation) of Hünenberg, and from 1857 to 1865 president of the municipality of Hünenberg. He died in Cham on 15 March 1893.

== Bibliography ==
- Zuger Volksblatt, 18 March 1893
