= Woo Media =

Former social network

- Type: Private
- Industry: Online social networking Online dating Video chat
- Founded: 2007
- Founder: Stephen Stokols
- Defunct: 2011
- Fate: Acquired by Zoosk
- Successor: Zoosk
- Area served: Global
- Key people: Stephen Stokols (Founder)
- Products: WooMe; WooMe.tv; ShufflePeople; MonsterChat
- Services: Live video chat Online dating Social video entertainment
- Number of employees: 60 (2011)

Woo Media was an online chat and video social network which offered a variety of interactive sites that provided live social entertainment through a computer or mobile device. The company raised $17 million in venture capital from several investors including Index Ventures, Atomico (founded by Niklas Zennström and Janus Friis), Mangrove Capital Partners, and Klaus Hommels. One analyst valued Woo Media at $41 million at the time it was funded. Online dating company Zoosk purchased Woo Media in November 2011. Zoosk purchased Woo Media for its properties’ commercial traction and for access to its 10 million active users.

== Overview ==
Woo Media was created by Stephen Stokols, an American entrepreneur, technologist and executive in 2007 after a conversation with his sister about the difficulties using an online dating service. Stokols had been working on new web based video technologies and used it to launch Woo Media’s first property, WooMe.com. Previously, Stokols served as the Vice President of new revenue opportunities at BT Group where he was responsible for evaluating applications of browser-based voice and video technologies.

Upon launching the website at TechCrunch40 in 2007, the founding product, WooMe had an initial 1,000 users. The site’s user base grew to 1,000,000 users in the first twelve months. The site has since been featured in The Guardian, Financial Times, The New York Times, TechCrunch, Metro.co.uk, Times Online, Mashable, Businessweek, Wired and PC Magazine. Stokols grew the organization from 5 employees in 2007 to over 60 in 2011.

The company broadened its focus over the past 5 years and, at the time of its sale, included additional websites of various interactive video experiences including one on one online chat experience (WooMe.com), reality TV online video (WooMe.tv), peer-to-peer video chat (ShufflePeople.com), and social group video chat (MonsterChat.com). The Woo Media network had over 10 million active users with an average of 20 thousand registrants per day at the time of the sale to Zoosk.

== Products and Services ==
=== WooMe ===
WooMe was an Adobe Flash based online dating platform, which enabled users to meet in live interactive video sessions via webcam. WooMe requires no questionnaires, profile descriptions or software download. WooMe allows users to meet new people around any shared interest.

The original product model included online speed dating sessions which lets users create or join topical live speed video chat sessions, connecting with 3 people in 3 minutes. Currently, WooMe is a one-on-one video chatting product where individuals can meet in an online atmosphere.

WooMe offers a freemium model that is free to register and browse profiles. Within this model, the product serves ads and offers a subscription service with premium features including reading messages, viewing interested profiles, sending gifts, the ability to tag WooMe profiles, to browse and search profiles by filtering attributes including location and age, and to share profiles with friends on Facebook.

=== WooMe.tv ===
WooMe TV combined reality TV, interactive video, and social networking. It was a social entertainment destination where users participated in live interactive video introductions, shared them with friends or the world, and watched interactive video introductions of others. Users could watch live online video posted by users who have authorized access to their WooMe profile, share favorite videos with friends through social networks and interact with other user profiles by rating and commenting on user videos.

WooMe.TV amassed over 20 million total video views and 500,000 pieces of unique content before it was sold to Zoosk.

=== ShufflePeople ===
ShufflePeople was a random interactive video introductions site that, like ChatRoulette and Omegle, enabled people from around the world to meet. This website randomly paired users to interact through their web-based cameras. Users have the ability to move on to another conversation at any point. They can also connect with Facebook to meet other users through a Facebook application. ShufflePeople was free and required no registration.

=== MonsterChat ===
MonsterChat was a group video chat room site that enabled friends to video chat with up to 16 people simultaneously. Users could create or join existing video chat rooms with up to 24 users to engage simultaneously around trending topics and interests. They could also connect with friends through an integrated buddy list including Facebook, Twitter, Yahoo!, Hotmail and AOL.

== Controversy and criticism ==
In August 2008, Chace Crawford criticized Woo Media after his picture was used without permission one of the Woo Media properties. Woo Media removed the picture, issued an official apology to Crawford for the oversight, and introduced screening measures.
