= Swiss Society for the Common Good =

Swiss organization

The Swiss Society for the Common Good (SSCG) (Note: German: Schweizerische Gemeinnützige Gesellschaft, SGG; French: Société suisse d'utilité publique, SSUP; Italian: Società svizzera di utilità pubblica, SSUP) is an institution that promotes an active civil society, social cohesion, and a vibrant democracy in Switzerland. Since its foundation in 1810, the SSCG has been involved in various social and political areas. It supports new charitable initiatives, participates in their financing, and accompanies their development. It also promotes exchange between actors from civil society, politics, and business.

The SSCG was the most important social and socio-political organisation in Switzerland during the development of the Swiss federal state and its foundation in 1848. The SSCG was the driving force behind the establishment of numerous social organisations.

== Areas of activity ==
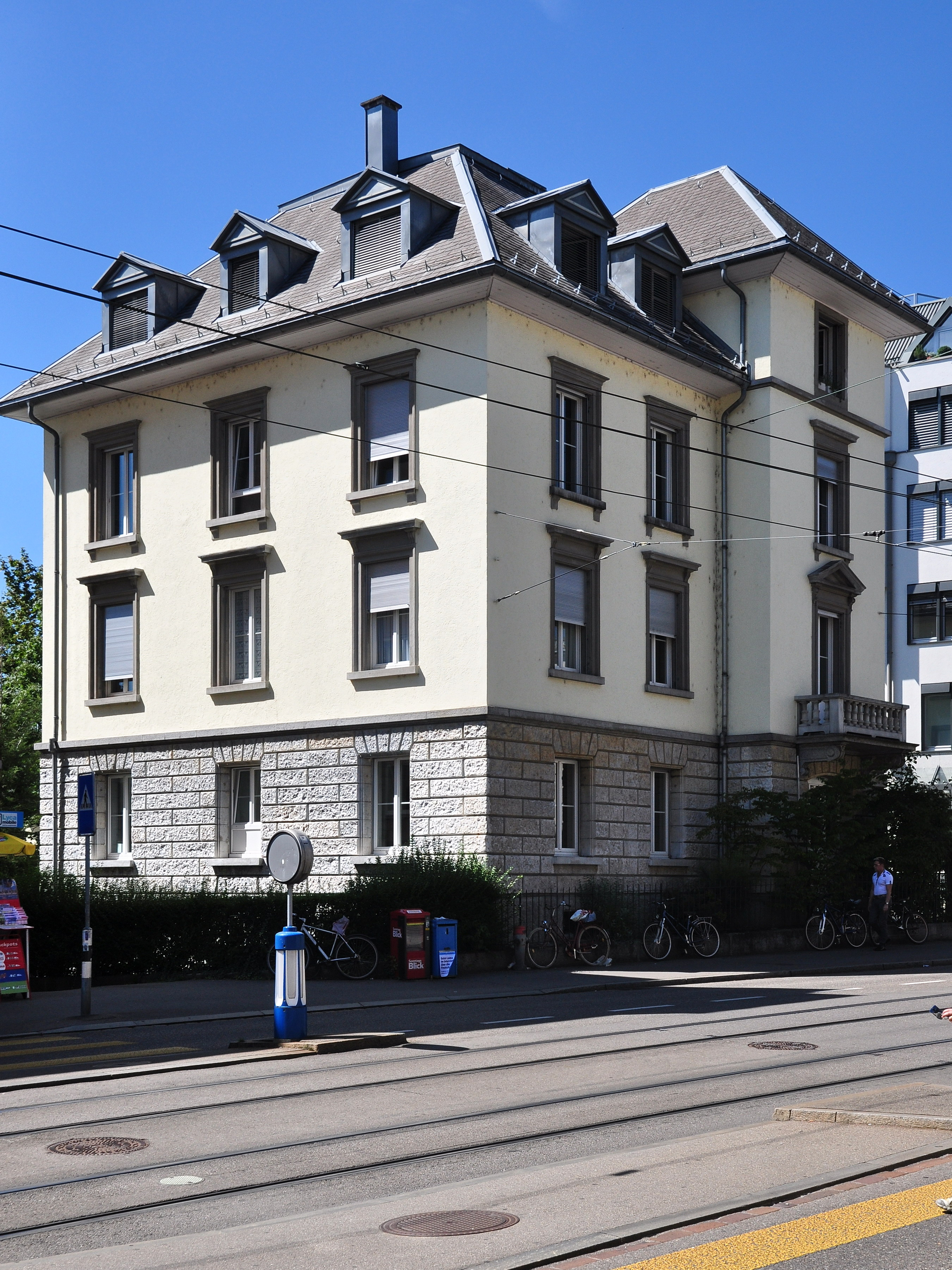
SSCG headquarters in Zurich-Unterstrass

In accordance with its purpose, the SSCG strives to strengthen civil society in Switzerland and promote solidarity between different social groups. The society is currently active in the areas of public education, public health, economics, and social work. The tasks of the SSCG can be summarised as follows:

- The SSCG runs four thematic programs of its own: The Pro Futuris program strengthens Switzerland's democratic culture through dialogue and participation projects. The SeitenWechsel program promotes social leadership skills among managers through internships in social institutions. For managers, this can take the form of an intensive week or a one-day workshop. The Intergeneration program brings together institutions and projects for young and old, either locally or virtually.
- The SSCG researches and promotes volunteer work in Switzerland and regularly publishes the Swiss Volunteer Monitor.
- In 2014, the SSCG launched an art competition to create a new Swiss national anthem. From the 208 entries, the public voted online for the contribution by Zurich health economist Werner Widmer. The new anthem text is based on the preamble to the Swiss Federal Constitution. Once it has gained sufficient popularity among the population, it will be submitted to the relevant authorities with a request that it be designated as the new national anthem. The new text was sung for the first time on the Rütli in 2016; according to media reports, the SSCG angered part of parliament with the text. Four former members of the Federal Council were also found in the support committee in 2017.
- The SSCG has managed the Rütli since 1860 and organizes an annual national celebration there.

== History ==
=== Founding of the association ===
The SSCG saw itself as the heir to the Helvetic Society and pursued enlightened and patriotic goals based on the model of the Society for the Good and Charitable in Basel, founded in 1777. It placed the common good at the centre of its work and concentrated in its early decades on combating poverty through the promotion of education, upbringing, and economic progress. The liberal-minded members of the SSCG, who were of both Reformed and Catholic backgrounds, promoted a reform-oriented forum for discussion among the political, economic, and spiritual elites, thereby contributing to national integration and supporting the state.

The SSCG was founded in Zurich in 1810 by a group of friends of Zurich city physician Hans Caspar Hirzel, who had issued an invitation to establish the organisation on behalf of the Zürcher Hülfsgesellschaft (Zurich Relief Society). Under the name Schweizerische Gemeinnützige Gesellschaft SSCG, Société suisse d'utilité publique SSUP, Società svizzera di utilità pubblica, Società svizzra and ütil public, an association within the meaning of Article 60 ff. of the Swiss Civil Code has existed since 16 May 1810. Its registered office has been in Zurich since its foundation.

=== Charitable status in the 19th century ===
From 1823 onward, the SSCG's annual meetings were used as a kind of think tank to discuss specific issues that had been empirically researched by members. The socio-political papers and discussion contributions were published in the Verhandlungen der SSCG (Proceedings of the SSCG) and, from 1862 onward, in the Schweizerische Zeitschrift für Gemeinnützigkeit (Swiss Journal of Public Welfare). The practical implementation of the ideas and projects developed in the discussions was initially carried out by local actors and, after 1830, was increasingly replaced by the SSCG's own practical activities.

At the annual meeting in 1823, Johann Caspar Zellweger proposed combating poverty through education, which would also promote knowledge, morality, and good manners. The lively debate on education within the SSCG paved the way for liberal school reforms, which were implemented throughout Switzerland from the 1830s onward. In 1835, the SSCG set up a commission for the education of the poor, which was dedicated to training so-called teachers for the poor. In the mid-1850s, thanks to its first large bequest, the SSCG was able to establish the first teacher training college in Schwyz.

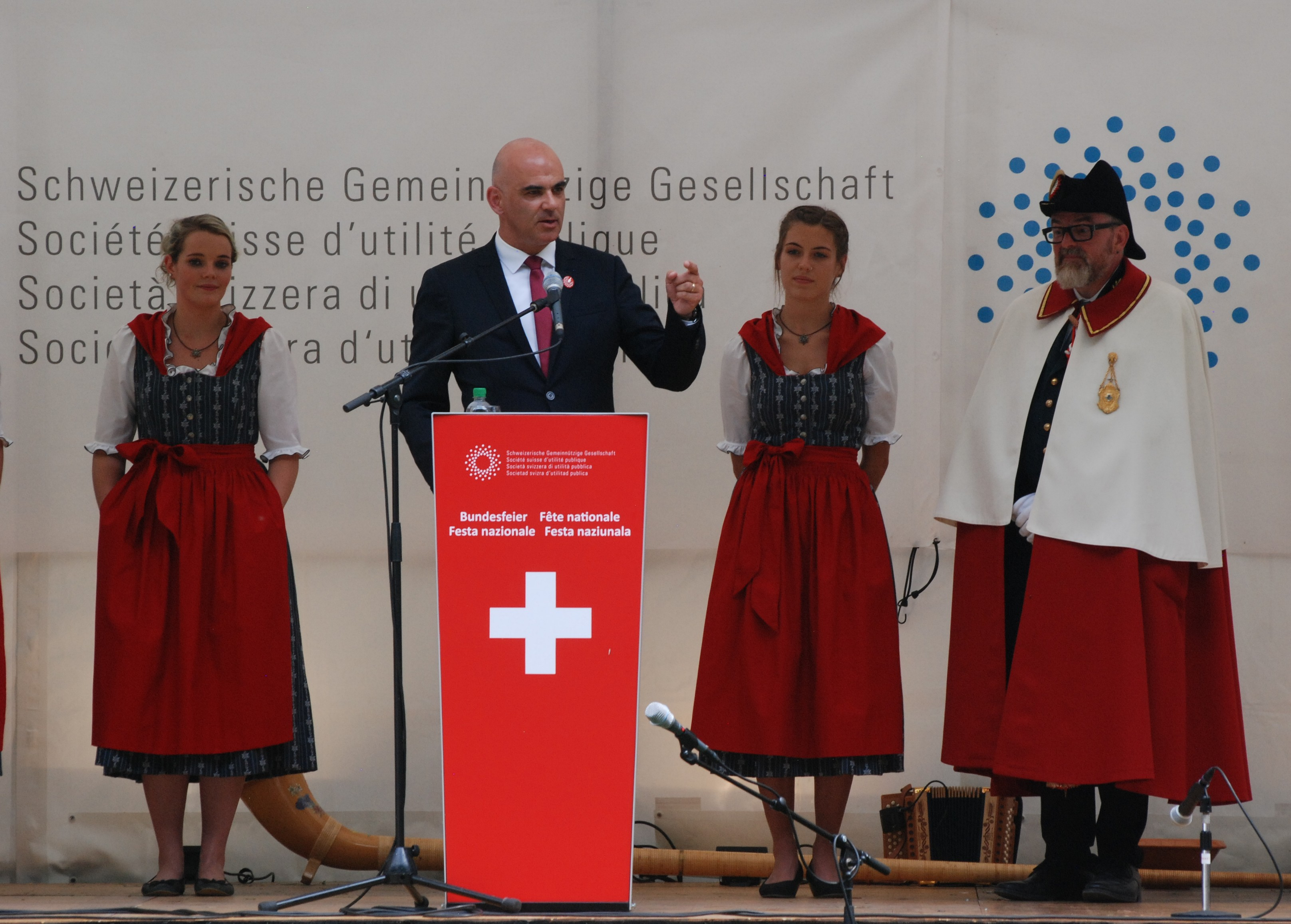
Federal President Berset as guest of the SSCG at the Swiss National Day celebrations on 1 August 2018 with ladies-in-waiting and the Weibel in front of the SSCG logo.

From 1828 onward, the SSCG held its annual meetings at various locations in Switzerland to strengthen relationships and ties and promote national cohesion. During the turbulent 1840s, the SSCG promoted peaceful attitudes and humanity, and was a place where political opponents placed dialogue at the centre of their efforts.

The SSCG made its first public appearance in 1834, coordinating a collection of money for the victims of a major storm disaster in the foothills of the Alps. This campaign led to the creation of the Fund for Natural Disasters, which was renamed the Fonds Suisse in 2016.

With the purchase of the Rütli and its donation to the Swiss Confederation in 1859, the SSCG established a lasting national reputation. In the 19th century, the SSCG founded and ran educational and reform institutions (special schools and schools for children with special needs), promoted vocational training, provided information on health and nutrition issues, and fought alcohol and gambling addiction. In 1901, the SSCG set up a fund to provide assistance for uninsurable damage caused by natural disasters.

=== Welfare organisations in the 20th century ===
In the 20th century, the SSCG founded various private welfare organisations: Pro Juventute in 1912, Pro Senectute in 1917, the Foundation for the Promotion of Community Centres and Community Halls in 1918, and Pro Mente Sana in 1978. By founding and supporting conferences and setting up a secretariat in 1930, it contributed to understanding in family policy (Swiss Family Protection Commission 1931, Pro Familia 1942), to the coordination of private welfare organisations, and to the professionalisation of social work. In 1932, it initiated the Swiss National Conference for Social Work (LAKO), which initially focused on coordinating refugee aid and led to the founding of Swiss Mountain Aid in 1942. In 1934, it initiated the founding of the Central Information Office for Welfare Organisations ZEWO.

From the mid-19th century onward, the SSCG received financial resources through donations and bequests. In the 20th century, its assets under management rose steadily from CHF 180,000 in 1910 to CHF 5.7 million in 1980 and CHF 63 million in 2009. This enabled it to focus on granting subsidies and providing assistance in individual cases. At the same time, the expansion of social welfare structures and the lack of integration of the new socialist-oriented reform forces diminished the political influence of the think tank, which was characterised by conservative values, economic liberalism, and criticism of the welfare state.

=== Reorientation in the 21st century ===
In the 1990s, a reorientation began that led to increased promotion of volunteer work. The SSCG supports the volunteer app Five up, which was developed to coordinate volunteer work. It is jointly supported by the SSCG, the Swiss Red Cross (SRK), and Apps with love (AWL) (until 2021 under the leadership of the company Five up Community AG). Five up comprises a front end with native apps and a web app in four languages (German, French, Italian, and English) and a cloud-based back end. The number of registered users rose to over 100,000 between the app's launch in summer 2018 and summer 2021, especially as there was a greater need for volunteer coordination at the beginning of the COVID-19 pandemic. Five up won gold in the Enterprise category at Best of Swiss Apps in 2019.

A commission of the SSCG is investigating volunteer work. The managing director of the SSCG noted in spring 2023 that the extent of volunteer work in Switzerland is not declining. Sixty-two percent of Swiss people are involved in volunteer work, but it is becoming more individualistic and less long-term, making it more difficult and time-consuming to coordinate.

Part of this reorientation was the launch of the "Think+Do Tank" Pro Futuris in 2022, which aimed to develop new opportunities for democratic participation and new self-images of Switzerland as the "nation's drawing room". In addition, the SSCG held a debate among think tanks on climate change in 2022.

The General Assembly, which was first postponed in 2020 due to the COVID-19 pandemic and then held in writing, approved a new association structure; the Executive Board was no longer a committee of the Central Commission, which was to be dissolved. The Netzwerk Gemeinnützige Schweiz (NGS) was established as the coordinating body for all regional non-profit organisations. At the same meeting, the office of the president was advertised publicly for the first time, and unlike his predecessors, the person elected, Nicola Forster, was in professional employment. In 2021, there was again no in-person general meeting. At the next general meeting in summer 2022, not all items on the agenda were dealt with, which led to an extraordinary general meeting in November 2022.

When two members of the Executive Board, including Elisabeth Baume-Schneider, who had been elected to the Federal Council, had to be replaced at the 2023 AGM, asset manager Jürg Kallay, who did not consider the nominations to be diverse enough, sought candidates himself, such as economics professor Reiner Eichenberger. Kallay had previously publicly accused the board members of being politically left-wing. He also admitted that he had mobilised his employees and young politicians from various parties for this election. During this time, there was a noticeable increase in new membership applications, around 120 according to Keystone, by the beginning of May. In the Aargauer Zeitung, Christian Mensch wrote of a coup by right-wing conservatives. The board responded by speaking of a 'loss of trust' and called on the general meeting to dismiss Jürg Kallay. Jürg Kallay was voted out at the general meeting on 17 June 2023. In December 2023, Forster announced his resignation with effect from June 2024, after the board had unanimously approved the SSCG's new strategy, thereby reaching a milestone.

The shareholders' meeting on 21 June 2024 elected the mayor of Frauenfeld, Anders Stokholm (FDP), who also heads the Swiss Cities Association, as the new president.

== Organization ==
=== Club objective ===
According to its statutes, the purpose and mission of the society is to promote intellectual and material social welfare in Switzerland.

=== Cantonal and regional charitable societies ===
In addition to the Swiss Charitable Society (SSCG), independent charitable societies have been established in almost all cantons. The SSCG works closely with cantonal, regional, and local charitable societies. The cantonal and regional societies have developed very differently over time and have taken on various forms. The Society for the Good and Charitable in Basel is an important partner of the public sector in the social policy of the canton of Basel-Stadt, as is the Charitable Society of the canton of Zug. The Bernese Economic and Charitable Society is particularly important for the farming population of the canton and beyond, with its newspaper Schweizer Bauer.

In the 1830s, the SSCG encouraged the formation of women's associations dedicated to the education and training of young women. By the middle of the 19th century, 1,030 charitable women's associations had been established, and in 1888, the Swiss Charitable Women's Association (SGF) was founded, which initially focused on the issue of domestic science education. This was triggered by the hardship faced by the population at the end of the 19th century, with unemployment and few training opportunities for women. Home economics lessons were combined with the hygiene movement led by doctors for the benefit of public health. The association promoted efforts that led to compulsory home economics lessons in the 1930s, known as the "Rüebli-RS" (carrot military service).
