= Anna Heer =

Swiss physician (1863–1918)

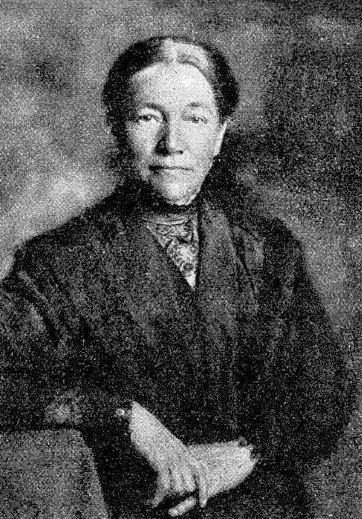
- Born: 22 March 1863
- Died: 9 December 1918 (aged 55)

Anna Heer (1863–1918) was a Swiss physician, who specialised in obstetrics, surgical gynecology and social medicine. She is a notable early Swiss medical graduate, and played a major role in the founding of Switzerland's first professional nursing school. She was its medical superintendent for seventeen years.

== Life ==
Anna Heer was born in Olten, Switzerland in 1863. Heer specialised in obstetrics, surgical gynecology and social medicine. Heer's doctoral dissertation was on skull fractures, and was published in the journal Bruns Beitrage zur Klinishen Chirurgie in 1893.

On starting to practice medicine, Heer realised that the quality of nursing was variable. She was also interested in the education and social emancipation of women. Heer worked with Ida Schneider and Marie Vögtlin to found one of the first women’s hospital in Zurich, the Swiss School of Nursing and Hospital for Women (the Schweizerische Pflegerinnenschule mit Frauenspital). In 1897 Heer became the chief physician at the hospital, and held this post for the rest of her life.

She was the head of the SUPFS since 1901 as well as the head of pflegerinnenschule of Zurich, but she also founded the Zurich Association of Nurses in 1909, and the Alliance Suisse des gardes-malades (ASGM) in 1910 with Walter Sahli. Sahli was the first secretary of the Swiss Red Cross. Heer was president of ASGM from its founding until 1916. She died on 9 December 1918 in Zurich from sepsis.

== Legacy ==
A street in Zurich is named after Heer, the Anna-Heer Strasse. A postage stamp was printed with her image on in 1963.
