= DTU =

DTU may refer to:

== Organisations ==
- Technical University of Denmark (Danish: Danmarks Tekniske Universitet), so named 1994
- German Taekwondo Union (German: Deutsche Taekwondo Union), founded 1981
- German Dance and Entertainment Orchestra (German: Deutsches Tanz- und Unterhaltungsorchester), formed 1942
- Delhi Technological University, India; so named 2009
- Dominica Trade Union, founded 1945
- Dunedin Tailoresses' Union, New Zealand
- Duy Tan University, Vietnam; founded 1994

== Transport ==
- Wudalianchi Dedu Airport, Northeast China; opened 2017 (IATA:DTU)
