= Puketāpapa Women's Suffrage Memorial =

Memorial in Auckland, New Zealand

Coordinates: 36°54′34.12″S 174°45′29.55″E

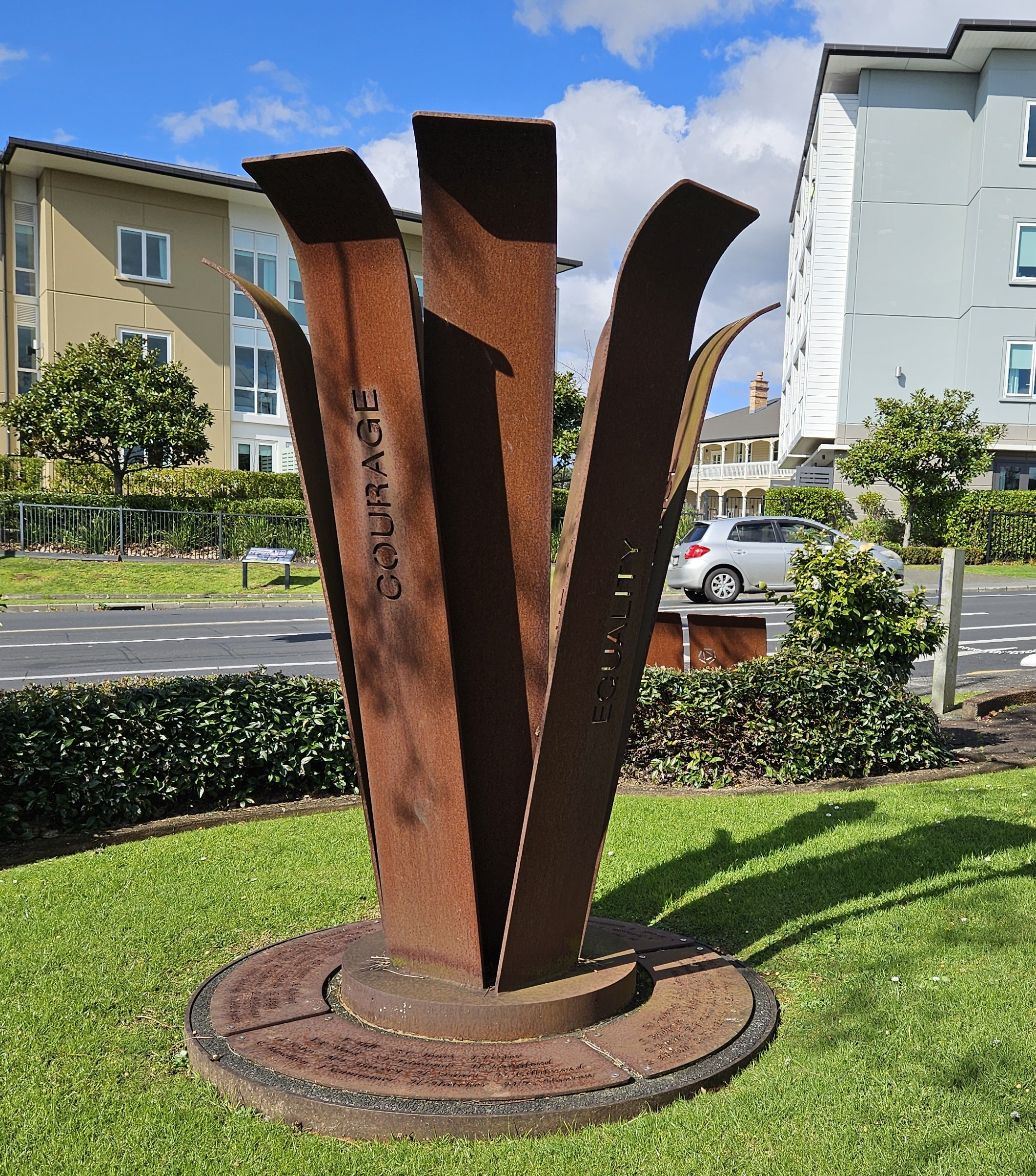
- Artists: Matthew van Sturmer and Carmen Sosich
- Year: 2013
- Type: Corten steel
- Location: Auckland, New Zealand

The Puketāpapa Women's Suffrage Memorial is located in Rose Park, on the corner of Warren Avenue and Mt Albert Road, in the suburb of Three Kings, Auckland, New Zealand. It commemorates the local women who campaigned for women's suffrage.

The memorial was commissioned by the Puketāpapa Local Board and Auckland Council, designed by artists Matthew van Sturmer and Carmen Sosich and constructed by MvS Studio. The design is an abstract depiction of the camellia, which was a symbol of the suffrage movement in New Zealand in the nineteenth century. The base of the flower is inscribed with the names of the local women who signed the 1893 petition to Parliament requesting the vote for women. A nearby plaque records the names of Mt Roskill women who have been elected to local and central government, including former prime minister Helen Clark.

It was unveiled on 19 September 2013, the 120th anniversary of women gaining the vote in New Zealand.

== See also ==
- Kate Sheppard National Memorial
- List of monuments and memorials to women's suffrage
