= Margriet Windhausen =

New Zealand sculptor and painter (born 1942)

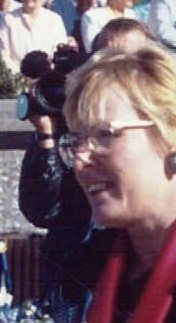
Windhausen in 1992

Margriet Windhausen (born 24 June 1942) is a New Zealand sculptor and painter.

== Life ==
Margriet Windhausen was born in Roermond, Netherlands to painter Fons Windhausen and is the fourth generation of the Windhausen family to be an artist. She studied sculpture from 1962 to 1965 at the City Academy of Fine Arts in Maastricht. From 1965 to 1972 she was a teacher at Posterholt. She emigrated to New Zealand in 1976, where she made a name as a sculptor. For 25 years from 1990, she and her husband Paul van den Bergh lived in Timaru in two churches that they moved to the site and converted into a home and studio. In 2014 they moved to the Kāpiti Coast. In 1993 she was awarded a New Zealand Suffrage Centennial Medal.

Windhausen and her husband have a number of children and grandchildren.

== Works ==
In the early 1980s she made a number of bronze portraits. She then received a number of commissions for monumental works, such as a bronze statue of the New Zealand boxer Bob Fitzsimmons, which was commissioned by New Zealand property magnate and boxing fan Sir Robert Jones, and which is located in a public square in Timaru. Windhausen also made a two-metre high work of the sailing ships of Abel Tasman. This work was commissioned by the Netherlands-New Zealand Federation, and unveiled in Wellington on 17 March 1992 by Queen Beatrix. For the centenary of women's suffrage in New Zealand, she made the Kate Sheppard National Memorial, a bronze relief measuring five by over two metres. This work was unveiled on 19 September 1993.

Windhausen's work also includes a statue of Captain John Hamilton which was installed in Hamilton's Civic Square. In 2018, the statue was vandalised by activist Taitimu Maipi. Maipi used a hammer and red paint to damage the statue, and said that it did not make sense to celebrate a man who murdered the ancestors of local Māori. Windhausen said that "history is controversial and that's why I want to say I respect [Taitimu Maipi's] feelings for Captain Hamilton". Windhausen said her sculpture, to her, only went as far as illustrating where the name of the city came from. Further protests against the statue followed in 2020, including a march. The statue was removed from the square in June 2020 by Hamilton City Council.

Windhausen created the bronze Land Girl Monument, which was installed and unveiled at Maungati in South Canterbury in October 2022, to commemorate the contributions of women who worked on farms in New Zealand during World War II.

Other works by Windhausen include a sculpture of athlete Jack Lovelock for Timaru Boys' High School and The Face of Peace, installed at Caroline Bay.

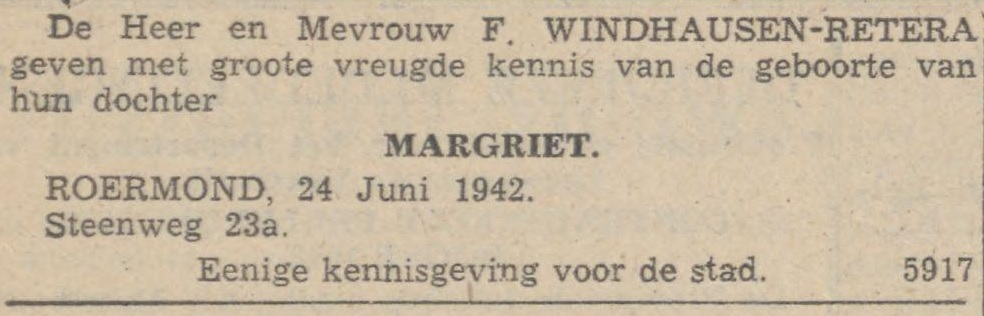
Windhausen's birth announcement

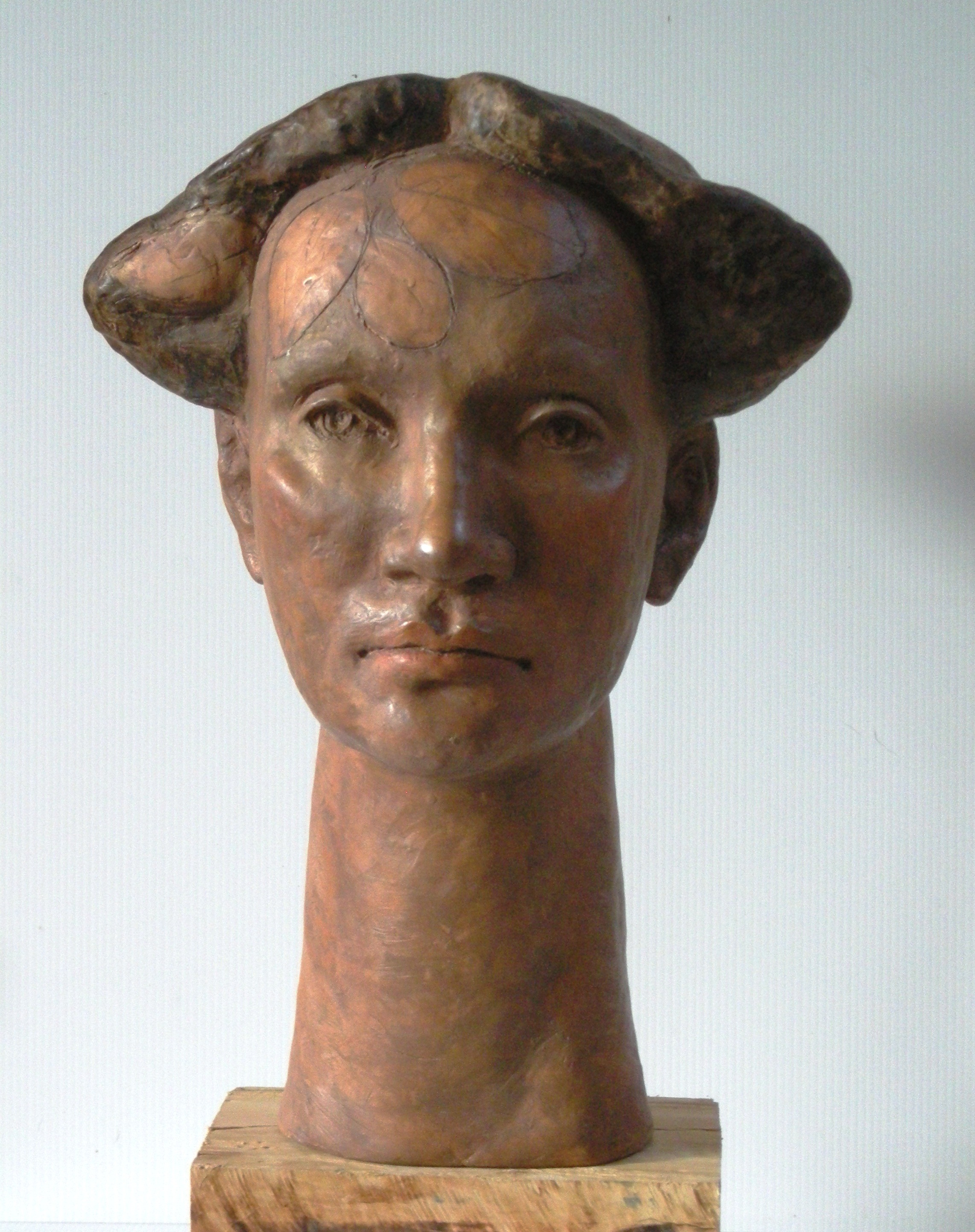

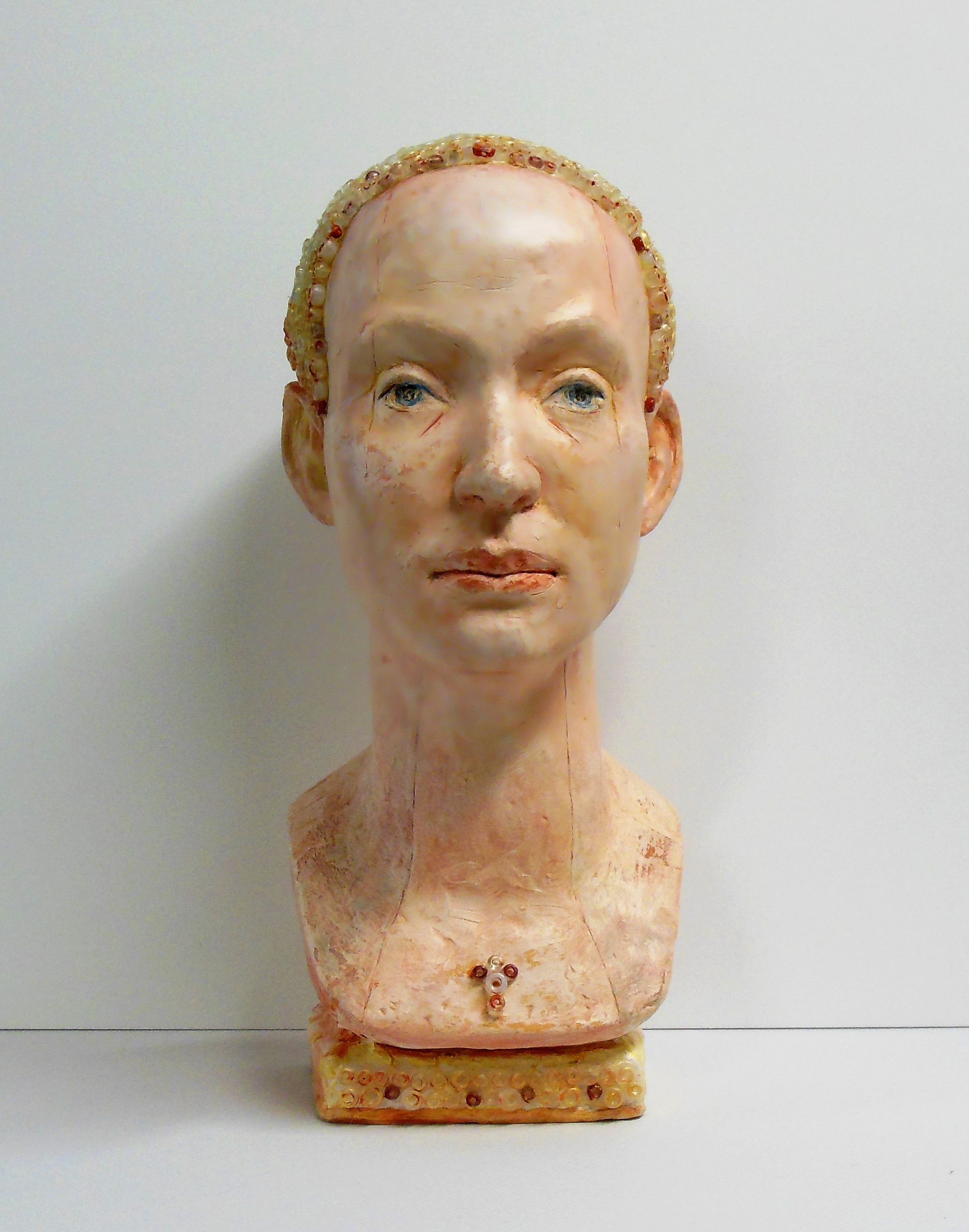

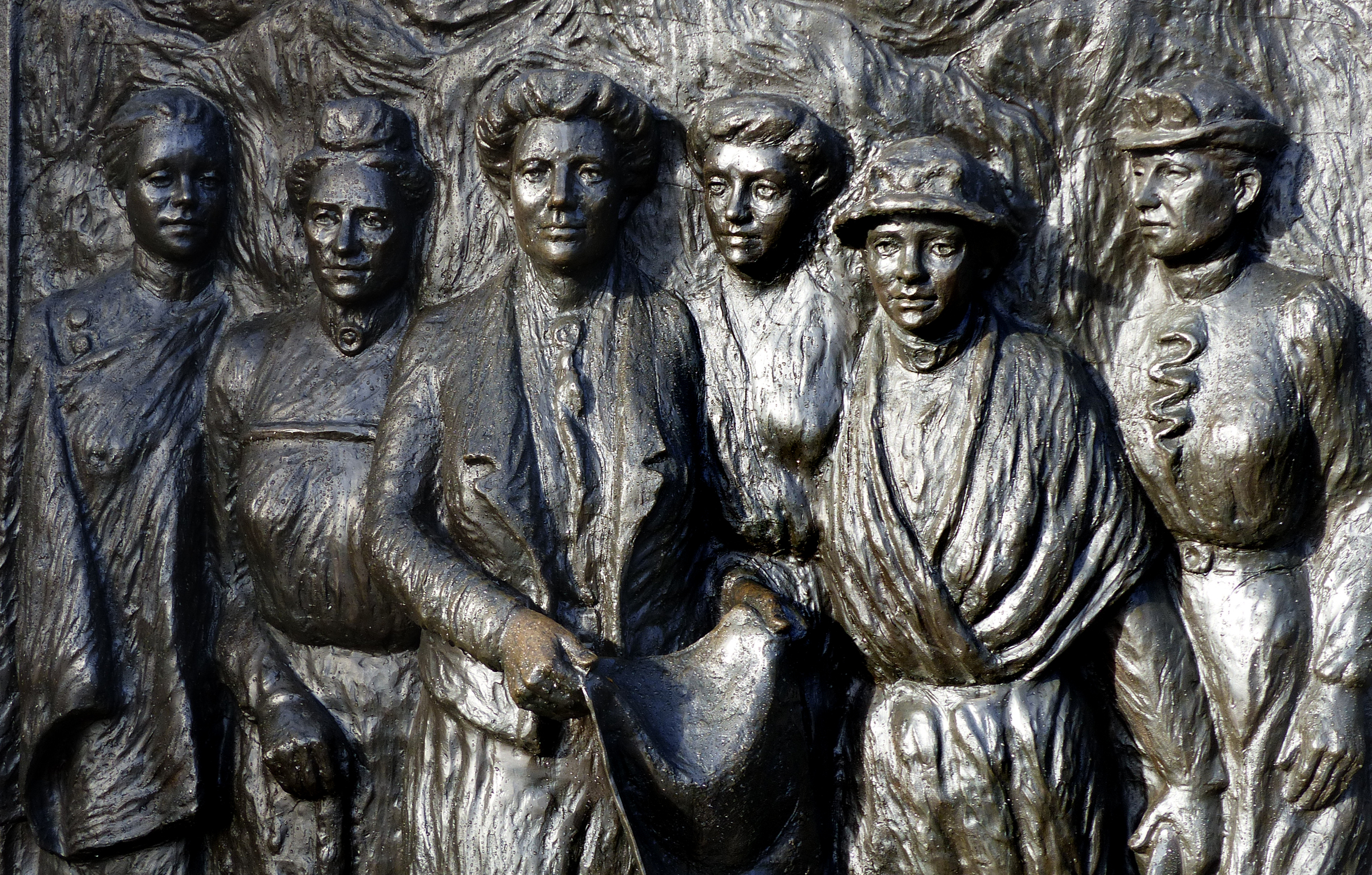
Kate Sheppard National Memorial

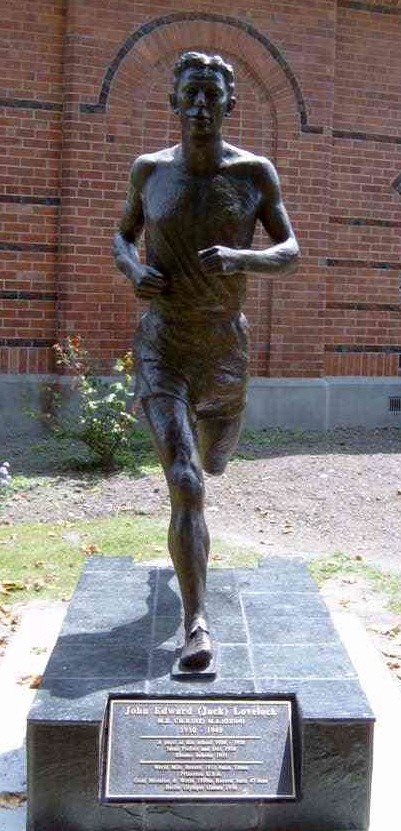
Jack Lovelock (2002), Timaru Boys High School, Timaru

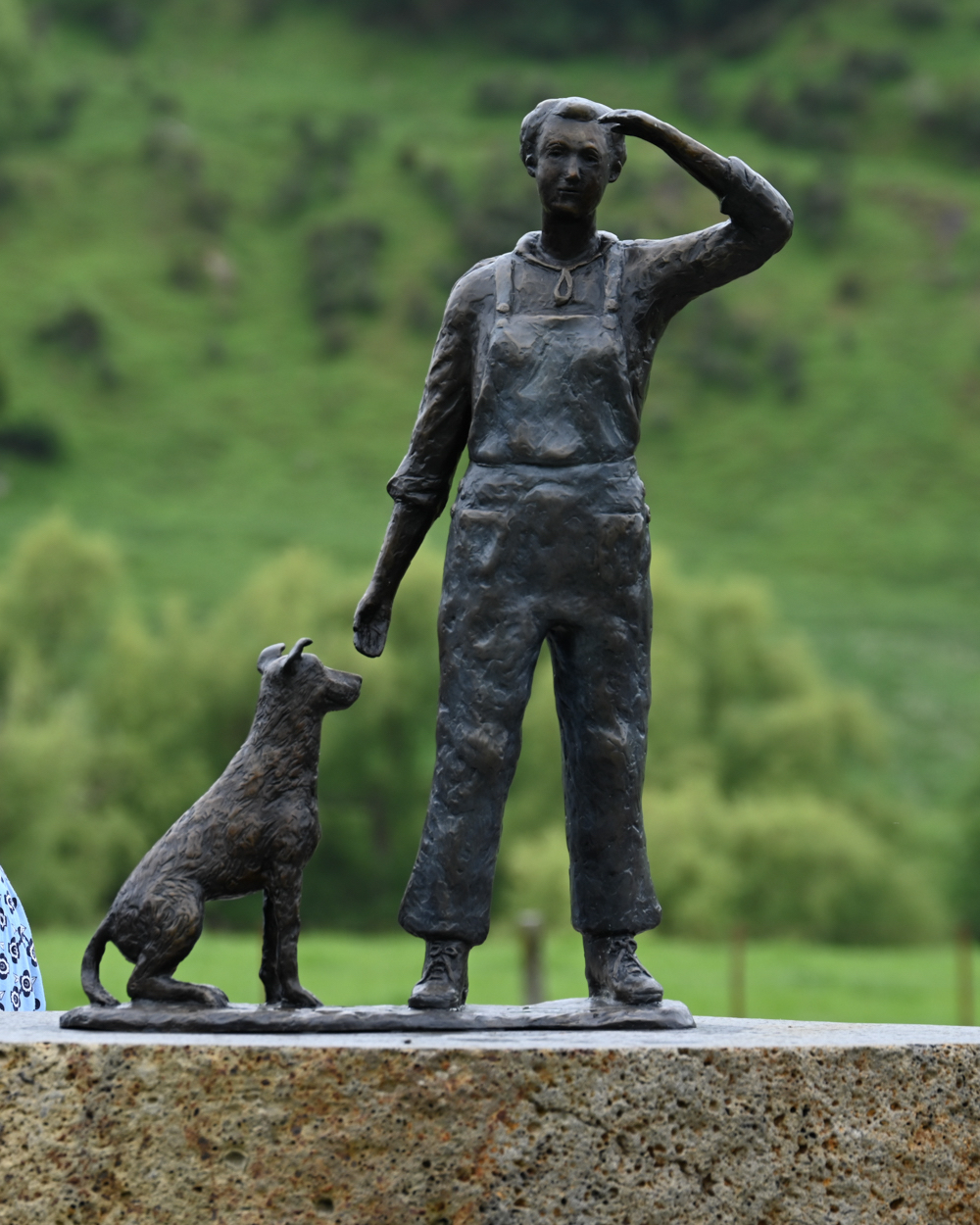
Land Girl Monument

Face of Peace, Caroline Bay, Timaru
