= Helen Nicol (suffragist) =

Suffragist, temperance campaigner

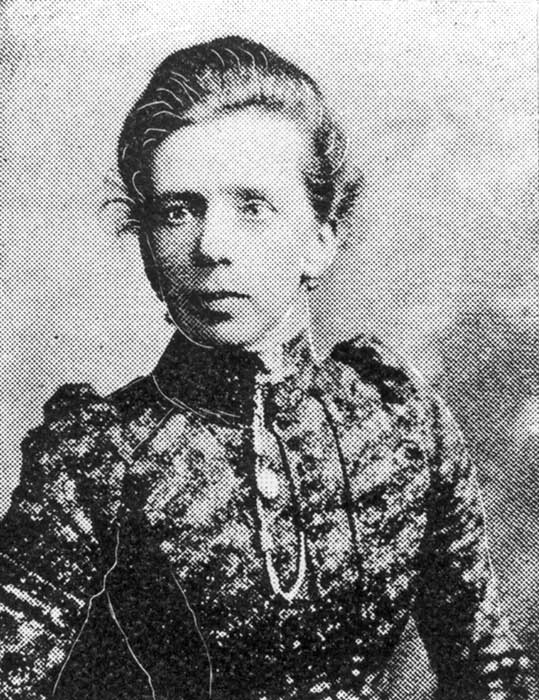
- Born: 29 May 1854; Edinburgh, Scotland
- Died: 22 November 1932 (aged 78); Dunedin, New Zealand
- Known for: A major leader of the women's suffrage movement and founder of the Dunedin Women's Franchise League

Helen Lyster Nicol (29 May 1854 – 22 November 1932) was a New Zealand suffragist and temperance campaigner. She is one of six suffragists honoured in the Kate Sheppard National Memorial.

== Biography ==
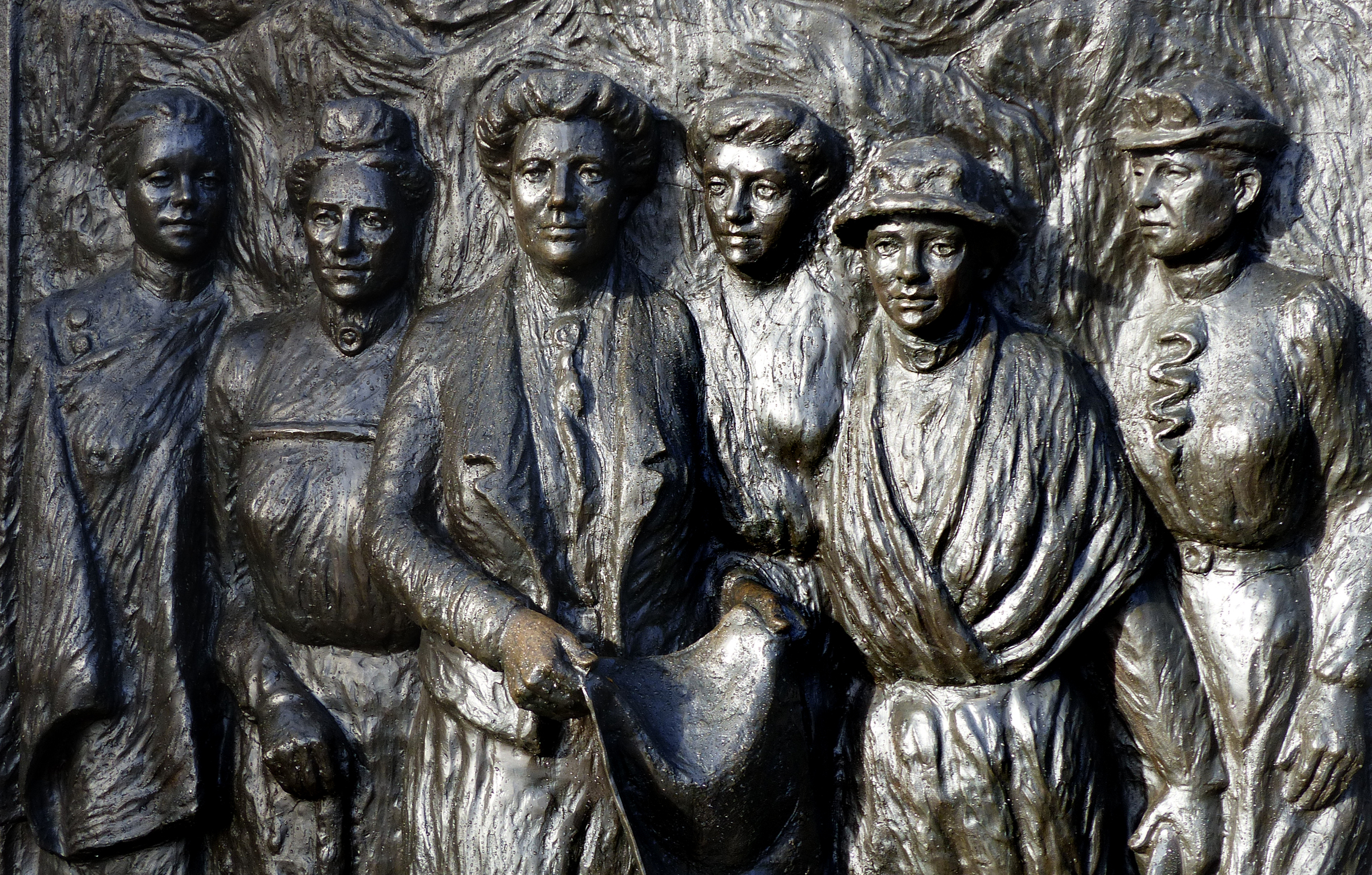
Nicol (right) commemorated in the Kate Sheppard National Memorial

Nicol was born in Edinburgh, Midlothian, Scotland, in 1854 but immigrated to New Zealand with her family at age two. She was one of ten children of Margaret (born Cairns Smith) and David Nicol. Her father was a gardener who prospered in New Zealand. She was a teetotaller and committed Presbyterian. She taught in a Sunday School, and her work with the poor exposed her to the ills of alcohol, and she became a committed prohibitionist and member of the temperance movement.

It was through her association with the New Zealand branch of the Women's Christian Temperance Union that Nicol became involved in the struggle for women's suffrage in New Zealand. She became one of the pioneering leaders of the suffrage movement in Dunedin, which was New Zealand's largest city at the time. Along with Marion Hatton and Harriet Morison, Nicol established the Women's Franchise League; the alcohol lobby in Dunedin was particularly strong, and the three decided that a pro-suffrage organisation outside the temperance movement would be more effective. Through their efforts, Dunedin contributed more signatures to the three pro-suffrage parliamentary petitions than any other part of the country. She is one of six suffragists memorialised in the Kate Sheppard National Memorial, a sculpture located on the banks of the Avon River in Christchurch.

Nicol died on 22 November 1932 in Dunedin, New Zealand.

== See also ==
- Women's Christian Temperance Union New Zealand
- List of suffragists and suffragettes
