= Elise Honegger =

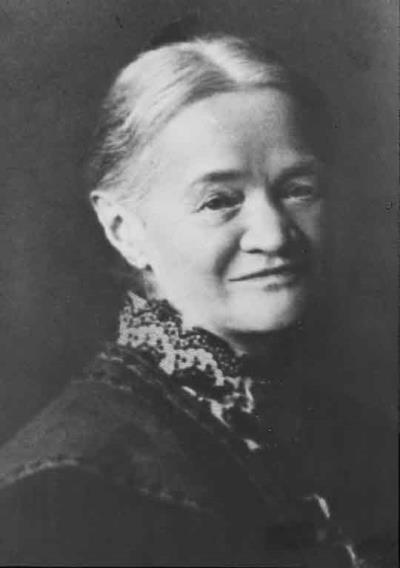
- Born: 28 November 1839; Stäfa, Switzerland
- Died: 14 November 1912 (aged 72); St. Gallen, Switzerland
- Occupations: Journalist, Activist
- Spouse: Mathias Egger (1867-1879)

Elise Honegger (28 November 1839 – 14 November 1912), was a Swiss feminist and journalist. In 1885, she founded and chaired the first national women's organization in Switzerland, Schweizer Frauen-Verband.

== Biography ==
Honegger was born in Stäfa on 28 November 1839.

In 1867 she married Mathias Egger, with whom she had seven children. Egger was a newspaper publisher, and around 1878, Elise edited the women's supplement of his publication Republikaners. Soon thereafter she divorced from her husband, taking employment as a freelance publisher and editor. Honneger established the women's newspaper Schweizer Frauen-Zeitung in 1879. The magazine was commercially successful, focusing on the role of wives and mothers (häusl).

Outside of her position as publisher, Honneger advocated for raising the status of women. In 1882 Honneger founded the Schweizer Frauen-Verband (Swiss Women's Association). In 1885 she was elected as the organization's first president. She soon came into conflict with the board and resigned in 1886.

She kept publishing her newspaper, selling it in 1911, remaining as editor almost until her death on 14 November 1912 in St. Gallen.
