= Dunedin Tailoresses' Union =

Trade union in New Zealand 1889–1945

- Abbreviation: DWTU
- Formation: 1889
- Founded at: Dunedin
- Dissolved: 1945
- Headquarters: Dunedin

The Dunedin Tailoresses’ Union (DTU) was a trade union in New Zealand from 1889 to 1945. It was New Zealand's first women's union. The union was established in 1889 by local labour leaders and citizens (all men) of New Zealand who were concerned about conditions and pay for working women and wanted to form a committee to negotiate with employers. Initially the union was led by men, but in 1891, Harriet Morison became the union secretary and 13 other women became executives with her. The union pursued a broad feminist programme, and assisted in the formation of tailoresses’ unions in other centres. This union provided money and an organiser's time to the fledgling Auckland, Wellington and Christchurch tailoresses' unions.

== History ==
The Dunedin Tailoresses' Union was New Zealand's first women's union. It was established on 14 February 1889 by local labour leaders and citizens (all men) of New Zealand who were concerned about conditions and pay for working women, and wanted to form a committee to negotiate with employers. These men included Rutherford Waddell, W. Downie Stewart , John A. Millar of the Seaman's Union and Silas Spragg, an Otago Daily Times reporter.

When employers refused to negotiate with the committee, the union was formed. Initially, the union was run by men, but in 1891 Harriet Morison became its secretary and 13 other women became executives with her. Thereafter, management of this union was quickly controlled by women.

At its height, the union represented 1400 members. It pursued a broad feminist programme, and assisted in the formation of tailoresses’ unions in other centres through the provision of money and an organiser's time to fledgling unions in Auckland, Wellington and Christchurch.

The DTU ceased to exist in June 1945, being absorbed into mixed-gender clothing unions led by men.

== See also ==
- Jane Runciman – New Zealand tailoress, union official, social reformer
- Harriet Morison – New Zealand tailor, trade unionist, suffragist and public servant (1862–1925). Secretary of DWTU from 1891–1896
- John A. Millar – New Zealand politician
