= Frauenkomitee Bern =

Frauenkomitee Bern was a women's organization in Switzerland, founded in 1893.

The organization was based in Bern and united the elite women of Bern, normally the wives of government officials. It played in important role, as it functioned as a channel between the federal government and the women's movement, and was consulted by the Federal authorities in women's issues on federal level.
