= Harriet Morison =

New Zealand tailor, trade unionist, suffragist and public servant (1862–1925)

Harriet Russell Morison
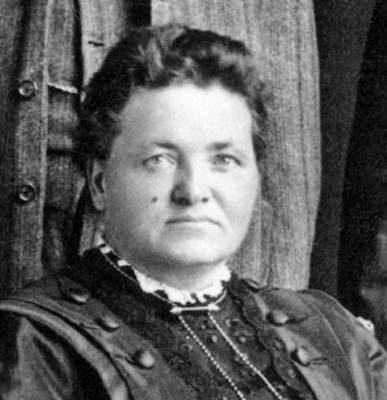
- Harriet Russell Morison, 1911
- Born: 1862; Magherafelt, County Londonderry, Ireland
- Died: 19 August 1925 (aged 62–63); New Lynn, Auckland, New Zealand
- Occupations: tailor, trade unionist, factor inspector
- Known for: trade unionist, feminist

Harriet Russell Morison (1862 – 19 August 1925) was a New Zealand tailor, trade unionist, suffragist and public servant.

== Early life ==
Morison was born in Magherafelt, County Londonderry, Ireland in 1862. She came to New Zealand with her parents in 1867 or 1874 and settled in Dunedin. Her father, James Morison, was a master tailor, and her first occupation was as a tailoress.

== Trade unionist ==
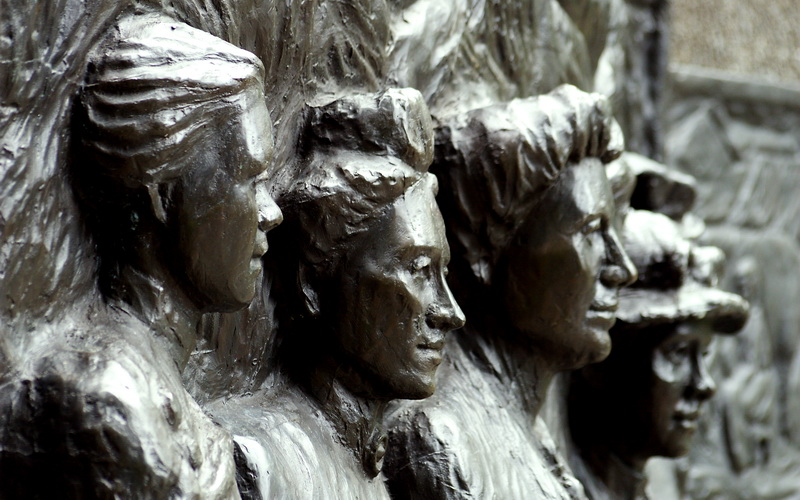
The Kate Sheppard National Memorial: Morison is the figure on the right, wearing a hat

New Zealand's first union of female workers, the Tailoresses' Union of New Zealand, held its inaugural meeting at the Dunedin Choral Hall on 11 July 1889. Morison attended, and became vice-president. She "threw her whole energy" into the organisation of the union, and took over the position of secretary in 1890, which she held until 1896. In February 1891 she went to Wellington to bolster the union branch there, and later that year she conducted a similar mission to Auckland. In 1892 she spent 26 weeks in Auckland rebuilding the local branch, which had been close to collapse. She was largely responsible for the union negotiating a minimum weekly wage of 7s 6d for clothing workers.

Morison also campaigned for women's suffrage, which she considered a natural part of egalitarian Christian principles. She organised ambulance classes for women, and was a foundation member of the Women's Christian Temperance Union. In 1892, she led a women's movement against Henry Fish's bid for the mayoralty of Dunedin. Fish was a Parliamentary spokesman for the liquor trade and opposed to suffrage. With her friend Helen Nicol, she founded the Dunedin Franchise League, which was independent of the temperance movement. Once suffrage was achieved, the League continued as a charitable organisation for women.

In 1896, Morison was dismissed from her post of union secretary. Part of her job was to raise funds for the union, but two picnics she organised in 1895 were unsuccessful due to the weather, and for a carnival in 1896 she failed to keep proper books. There was a suggestion that she had mismanaged or perhaps misappropriated funds, although there was no evidence for this and it may have been an example of infighting.

== Later life ==
For 14 years, Morison was an official visitor to the Seacliff Lunatic Asylum near Dunedin. The New Zealand Herald obituary describes her as having "a keen personal interest in the welfare of the mentally afflicted". She was active in the Bible Christian Church, as a lay preacher (one of the first female preachers in New Zealand) and as a chairwoman of the Unitarian Church Committee.

In 1906 she became a factory inspector for the Department of Labour in the South Island – the first female inspector in the country – and two years later she moved to Auckland to run a new Women's Branch of the Department. She retired in 1921 when she was made redundant, and after a period of failing health died at her home in New Lynn in 1925.

Throughout her life she was committed to her work and campaigning and never married nor had children. From 1893 until her death in 1925 she lived with her friend and companion Lilly Wild.

Morison is one of six figures honoured in the Kate Sheppard National Memorial in Christchurch, which was unveiled in 1993 on the 100th anniversary of suffrage in New Zealand.

== See also ==
- List of suffragists and suffragettes
- Timeline of women's suffrage
- Women's suffrage in New Zealand
