= Kate Sheppard National Memorial =

Memorial to the women's suffrage campaign, located in Christchurch, New Zealand

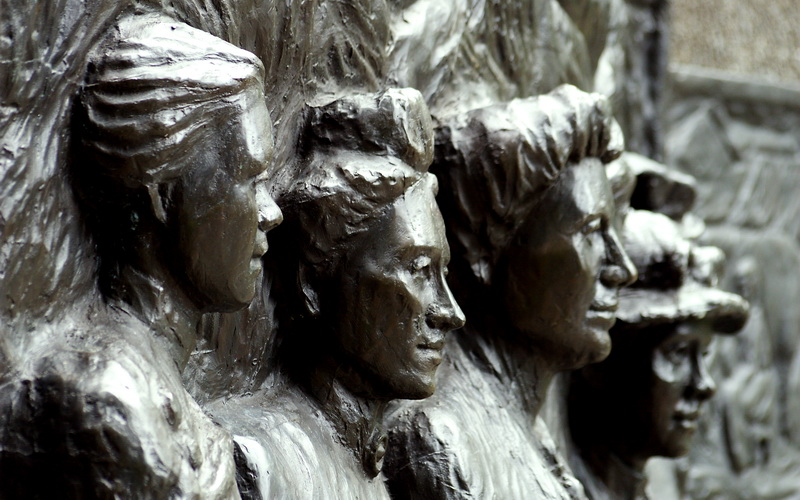
- Close up of the memorial
- Artist: Margriet Windhausen
- Year: 1993
- Type: Stone and bronze
- Dimensions: 2.1 m × 5 m (6.9 ft × 16 ft)
- Location: Christchurch, New Zealand; 43°31′50.09″S 172°38′0.7″E

Heritage New Zealand – Category 1
- Designated: March 2025
- Reference no.: 2090

The Kate Sheppard National Memorial, located in the city of Christchurch, is New Zealand's first memorial to the women's suffrage campaign, and particularly honours the life of one of the country's leading campaigners for women's suffrage, Kate Sheppard.

The idea for the memorial was raised in 1989 as part of plans to commemorate the 100th anniversary of women's suffrage in New Zealand in 1993. A committee was formed to select a design for the memorial, and the design of Dutch-born New Zealand artist Margriet Windhausen was chosen.

The memorial is a stone aggregate wall, with a life size bronze relief sculpture of Sheppard and five other women's suffrage leaders. Panels on either side of the sculpture depict scenes of everyday women's lives at the end of the nineteenth century, and carry text describing the struggle for women's suffrage. The whole structure is approximately 5 metres (16 ft) wide and 2 metres (6 ft 7 in) tall.

The women featured in the sculpture are (from left to right):

- Meri Mangakāhia of Te Tai Tokerau, who approached Te Kotahitanga (the Māori parliament) for women's suffrage
- Amey Daldy of the Auckland Woman's Christian Temperance Union.
- Kate Sheppard
- Ada Wells, a campaigner for girls' education
- Harriet Morison, an advocate for working women, also from Dunedin
- Helen Nicol, a women's suffrage campaigner who lived in Dunedin

The group of women are depicted carrying their petition for women's suffrage to Parliament in a wooden cart.

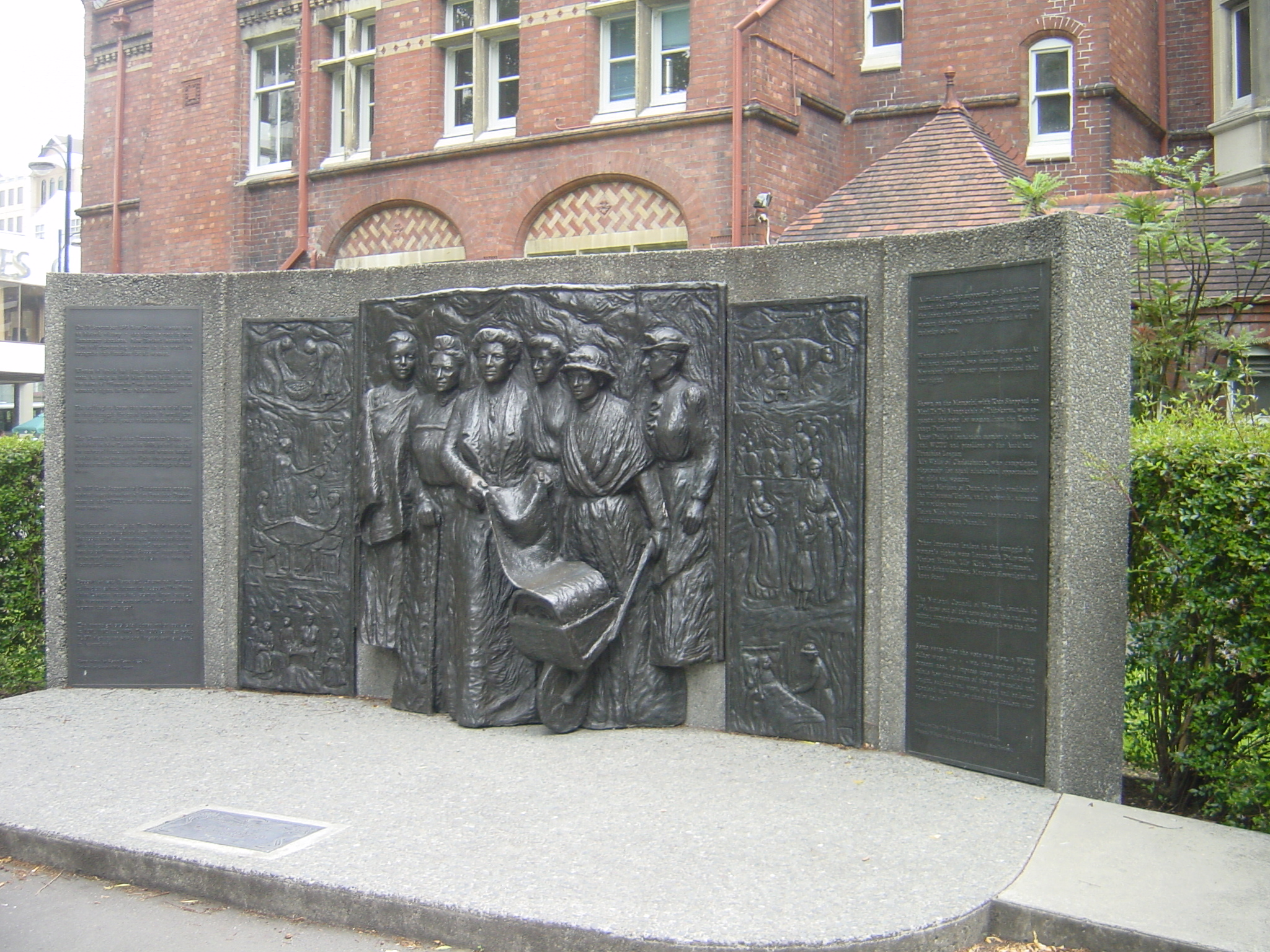
The entire memorial with bas-relief and side panels

The memorial was unveiled on 19 September 1993, the 100th anniversary of women's suffrage in New Zealand, by Dame Catherine Tizard, the Governor-General of New Zealand. A time capsule containing news articles and information on women's lives in 1993 was placed inside the monument.

The memorial is located in a landscaped area known as the Kate Sheppard National Memorial Reserve, beside the Avon River and adjacent to a heritage building, Our City (the Old Municipal Chambers) near the corner of Worcester Street and Oxford Terrace. This building was damaged in the 2010 Canterbury earthquake and the memorial was behind barricades while the building was assessed. In a ceremony presided over by the Mayor of Christchurch, Lianne Dalziel, in June 2014, the memorial was liberated from the barricades and public access was restored.

In March 2025, the memorial was added to the Heritage New Zealand register as a Category I entry.

== See also ==
- Puketāpapa Women's Suffrage Memorial
- List of monuments and memorials to women's suffrage
