= Loi sur l'héritage des enfants =

Loi sur l'héritage des enfants was a French law introduced during the French revolution in 1790. It was the first law to allow for equal inheritance rights for all children after their parents, regardless of their sex and age, rather than only the firstborn son. At the time it was unique in Europe.
