= Women's suffrage in New Zealand =

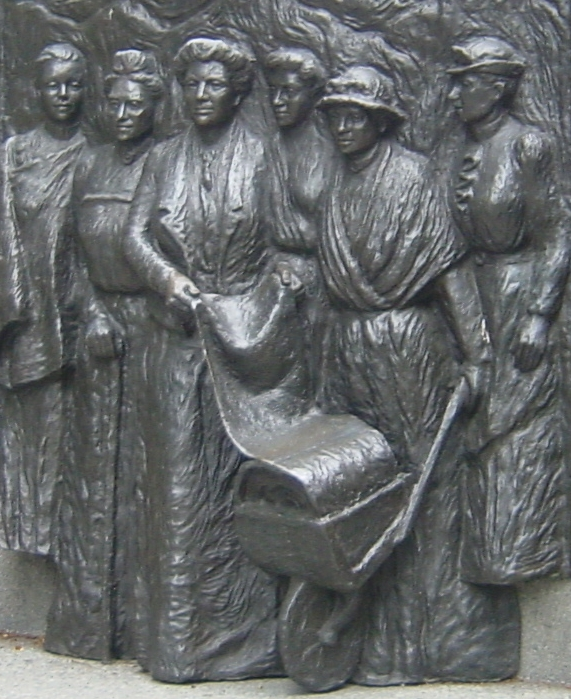
Bas-relief of suffragists on the Kate Sheppard National Memorial, Christchurch. The figures shown from left to right are Meri Te Tai Mangakāhia, Amey Daldy, Kate Sheppard, Ada Wells, Harriet Morison, and Helen Nicol.

Women's suffrage was an important political issue in late nineteenth-century New Zealand. In early colonial New Zealand, as in other European societies, women were excluded from any involvement in politics. Public opinion began to change in the latter half of the nineteenth century and after years of effort by women's suffrage campaigners, led by Kate Sheppard, New Zealand became the first nation in the world in which all women had the right to vote in parliamentary elections.

The electoral bill granting women the franchise was given royal assent by Governor Lord Glasgow on 19 September 1893. Women voted for the first time in the election held on 28 November 1893 (elections for the Māori electorates were held on 20 December). Also in 1893, Elizabeth Yates became mayor of Onehunga, the first time such a post had been held by a woman anywhere in the British Empire.

In the 21st century, there are more eligible female voters than male, and women also vote at a higher rate than men. However, a higher percentage of female than male non-voters perceive a barrier that prevents them from voting.

== Early campaign ==
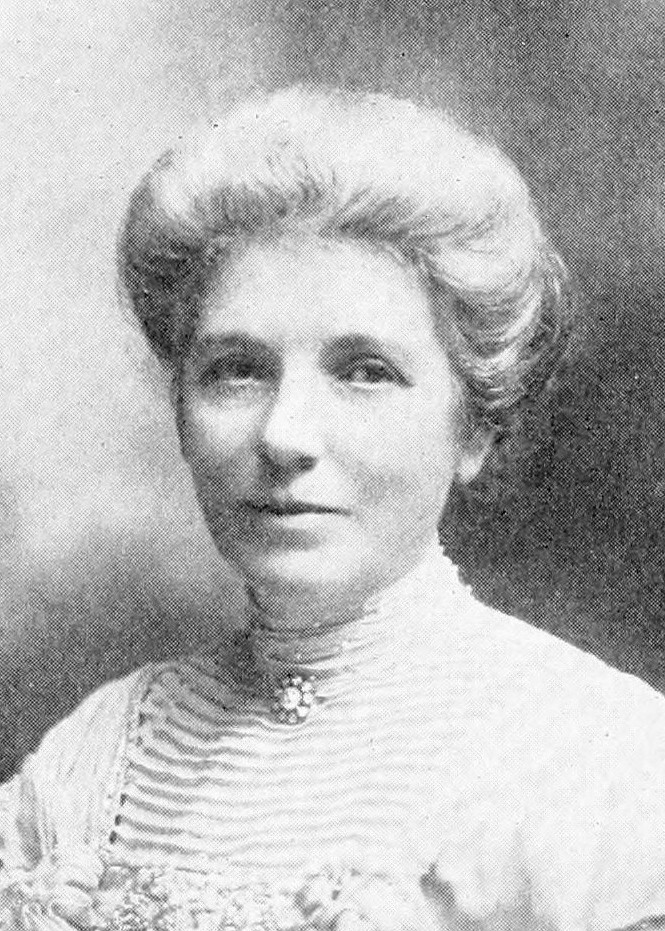
Kate Sheppard

In both Polynesian society and European aristocracy, women could achieve significant formal political rank through ancestry. However, Polynesian and by extension Māori society differed in letting charismatic women have significant direct influence. This was limited by the inability of women to speak at some meetings on marae (community houses). As a result, historian Barbara Brookes argues that colonialism was a temporary step back for women's rights in New Zealand.

The New Zealand suffrage movement began in the late 19th century, inspired by similar ideologies spreading throughout northern Europe, the British Empire, and the United States. The right to vote was largely sought as a way to improve social morality and, by extension, improve women's safety and quality of life. Therefore, the suffrage campaigns were intertwined with the prohibition of alcohol movement. This was the focus of some resistance, with the movement being often portrayed as puritanical and draconian in the local press. This also led to politicians who supported the alcohol industry, like the MP for South Dunedin Henry Fish, opposing women's suffrage.

In 1869, under a pseudonym, Mary Müller wrote An appeal to the men of New Zealand, the first pamphlet on the issue of women's suffrage to be published in New Zealand. In the 1870s, Mary Ann Colclough (Polly Plum) was an active advocate for women's rights in general and women's suffrage. John Larkins Cheese Richardson was a keen proponent of women's equality. He was responsible for allowing women to enrol at the University of Otago in 1871, and helped to remove other barriers to their entry. Some politicians, including John Hall, Robert Stout, Julius Vogel, William Fox and John Ballance, also supported women's suffrage and in 1878, 1879 and 1887 bills extending the vote to women were narrowly defeated in Parliament.

== Successful campaign ==
Women's suffrage was granted after about two decades of campaigning throughout New Zealand by women. The New Zealand branch of the Women's Christian Temperance Union (WCTU NZ) led by Anne Ward (1886–1887), Emma Packe (1887–1889), Catherine Fulton (1889–1892), and Annie Jane Schnackenberg (1892–1900) was particularly instrumental in the campaign. Influenced by the American Frances Willard of the Woman's Christian Temperance Union and the philosophy of thinkers like Harriet Taylor Mill and John Stuart Mill, the movement argued that women could bring morality into democratic politics. Kate Sheppard, a WCTU NZ activist, was a leading advocate for political action for women's rights. Opponents argued instead that politics was outside women's 'natural sphere' of the home and family. Suffrage advocates countered that allowing women to vote would encourage policies which protected and nurtured families.

Suffragists in WCTU, political franchise leagues and trade unions organised a series of petitions to Parliament: over 9,000 signatures were delivered in 1891, followed by a petition of almost 20,000 signatures in 1892, and finally in 1893 nearly 32,000 signatures were presented – almost a quarter of the adult European female population of New Zealand.

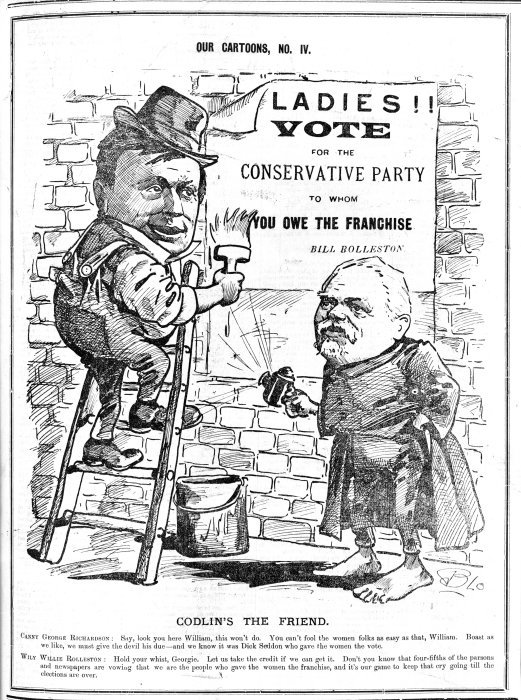
An 1893 cartoon depicting William Rolleston urging women to vote for the Conservative Party to whom they "owe the franchise".

From 1887, several attempts were made to pass bills enabling female suffrage, the first of which was authored by Julius Vogel, the 8th premier of New Zealand. Each bill came close to passing. Various electoral bills that would have given adult women the right to vote were presented to the House of Representatives but were either defeated or withdrawn.

In 1891, Walter Carncross moved an amendment that was intended to make a new bill fail in the Legislative Council. His amendment was for women to become eligible to be voted into the House of Representatives and in this way Carncross ensured that the conservative Upper House would reject the bill. This tactic infuriated the suffragist Catherine Fulton, who organised a protest at the 1893 election. An 1892 Electoral Bill, supported by John Ballance, would have provided for the enfranchisement of all women, but was delayed due to Ballance believing "the majority of women were politically uneducated and that their vote in the coming election would not be to the Liberals' [his party's] advantage".

By 1893 there was considerable popular support for women's suffrage. The 1893 Women's Suffrage Petition was presented to Parliament and a new electoral bill passed through the Lower House with a large majority. During debate, there was majority support for the enfranchisement of Māori as well as Pākehā women; the inclusion of Māori women was championed by John Shera, who was married to a woman of Māori and European descent. Lobbyists for the liquor industry, concerned that women would force the prohibition of alcohol, petitioned the Upper House to reject the bill. Suffragists responded with mass rallies and telegrams to Members of Parliament. They gave their supporters in Parliament white camellias to wear in their buttonholes. The Upper House was divided on the issue, and Premier Richard Seddon hoped to stop the bill.

Seddon needed one more vote to defeat the measure in the Upper House. A new Liberal Party councillor, Thomas Kelly, had decided to vote in favour of the measure, but Seddon obtained his consent by wire to change his vote. Seddon's manipulation incensed two other councillors, William Reynolds and Edward Cephas John Stevens, so they changed sides and voted for the bill, allowing it to pass by 20 votes to 18 on 8 September 1893. The two opposition councillors had been opposed to women's suffrage without the 'electoral rights' safeguard of postal voting, seen as necessary to allow all women in isolated rural areas to vote, although seen by the Liberals as rendering the vote open to manipulation by husbands or employers.

Eighteen legislative councillors petitioned the new governor, Lord Glasgow, to withhold his consent in enacting the law, but on 19 September 1893 the governor consented and the Electoral Act 1893 gave all women in New Zealand aged 21 or older the right to vote.

Both the Liberal government and the opposition subsequently claimed credit for the enfranchisement of women and sought women's newly acquired votes on these grounds.

In 1896, three years after the introduction of women's suffrage, Kate Sheppard became the founding president of the National Council of Women of New Zealand, which advocated for further political action for women's rights.

Early New Zealand suffragists

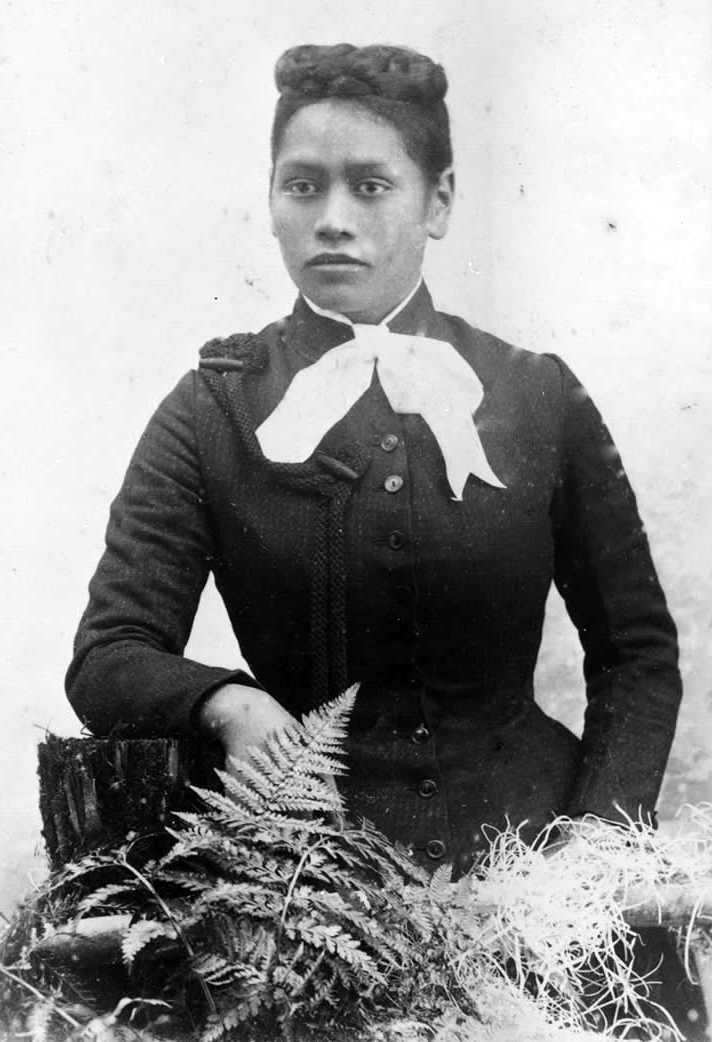
Meri Te Tai Mangakāhia (1868-1920)

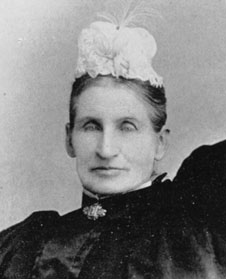
Amey Daldy (c1829-1920)

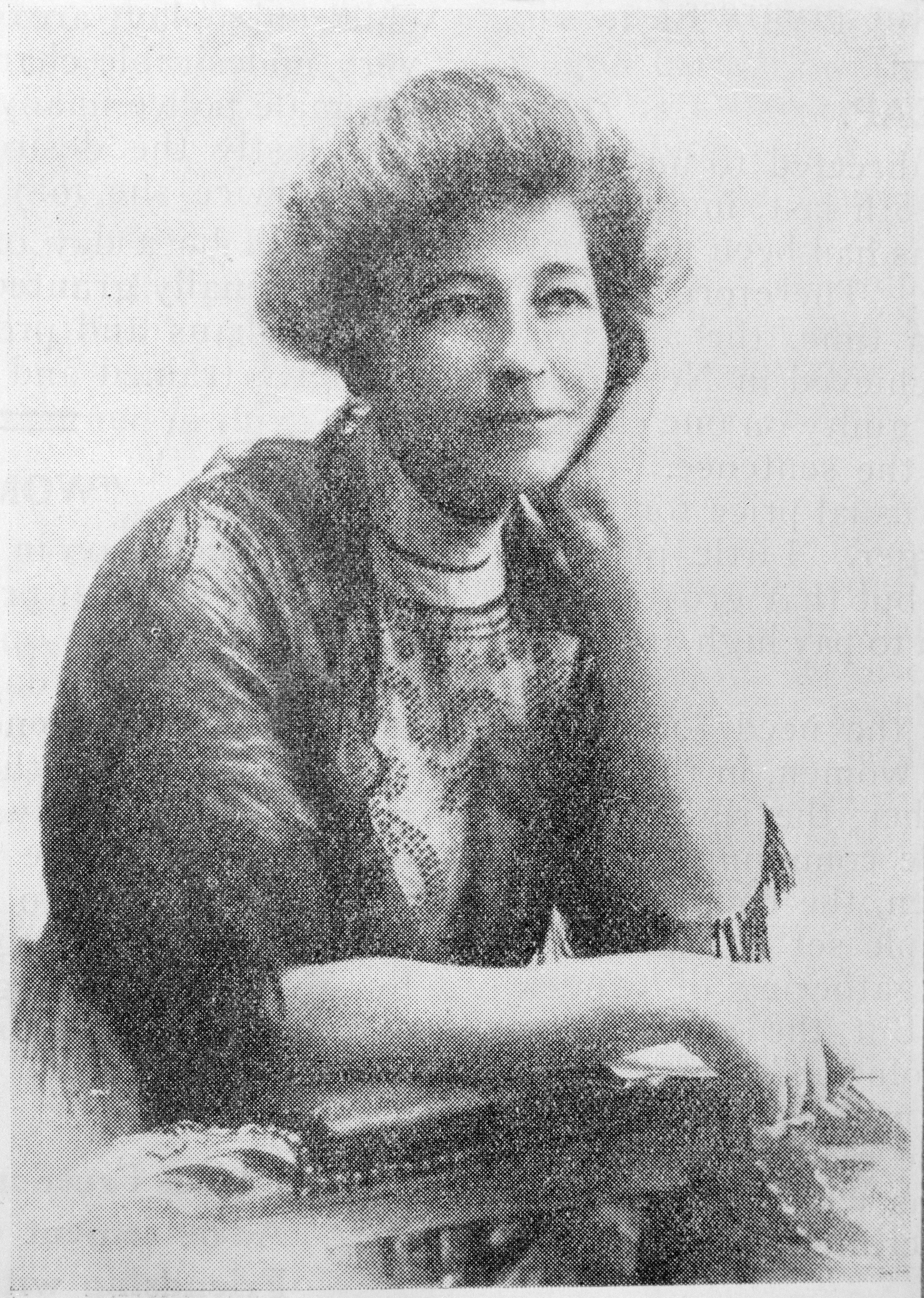
Ada Wells (1863-1933)

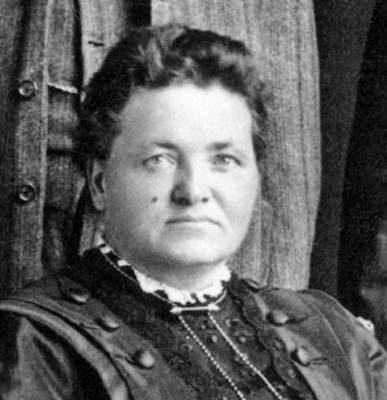
Harriet Russell Morison (1862-1925)

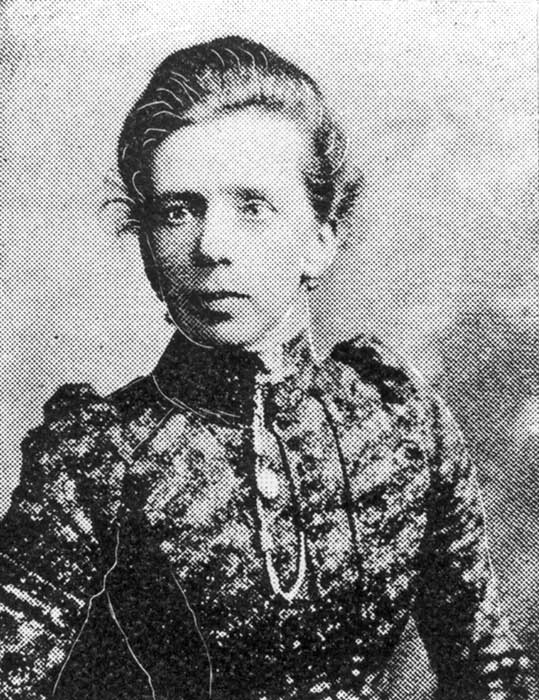
Helen Lyster Nicol (1854-1932)

== Further advances in women's rights ==
In 1893 Elizabeth Yates became the first woman in the British Empire to be elected mayor: after her husband resigned from the Onehunga mayoralty Yates stood for the position and won by just 13 votes. She was inaugurated on 16 January 1894 but lost the subsequent 1894 election by a strong margin. In 1926, Margaret Magill, an openly lesbian teacher and school administrator was elected to serve on the executive board of the New Zealand Educational Institute (NZEI). She became president of the organisation in 1933, her election to that post marking the first time it had been held by a woman.

Women were not eligible to be elected to the House of Representatives until 1919, when three women stood: Rosetta Baume (in Parnell for the Liberal Party), Ellen Melville (in Grey Lynn for the Reform Party), and Mrs Aileen Garmson (Cooke) (in Thames, as an "Independent Liberal"). None of them were elected.

Elizabeth McCombs was the first woman to be elected to Parliament (for the Lyttelton seat held by her late husband, via widow's succession) in the 1933 by-election. She was followed by Catherine Stewart (1938), Mary Dreaver (1941), Mary Grigg (1942), Mabel Howard (1943), and Hilda Ross (1945). Grigg and Ross represented the National Party, while McCombs, Stewart, Dreaver and Howard were all from the Labour Party. The first Māori woman MP was Iriaka Rātana in 1949: she also succeeded to the seat held by her late husband.

Women were not eligible to be appointed to the New Zealand Legislative Council (the Upper House of Parliament) until 1941. The first two women (Mary Dreaver and Mary Anderson) were appointed in 1946 by the Labour Government. In 1950 the "suicide squad" appointed by the National Government to abolish the Legislative Council included three women: Cora Louisa Burrell of Christchurch, Ethel Gould of Auckland and Agnes Weston of Wellington.

In 1989 Helen Clark became the first female deputy prime minister. In 1997, the then-current prime minister Jim Bolger lost the support of the National Party and was replaced by Jenny Shipley, making her the first female prime minister of New Zealand. In 1999, Clark became the second female prime minister of New Zealand, and the first woman to gain the position at an election. In 2017, Jacinda Ardern became the third female prime minister of New Zealand, and the second woman to gain the position at an election.

The New Zealand Suffrage Centennial Medal 1993 was authorised by Queen Elizabeth II by Royal Warrant dated 1 July 1993, and was awarded to 544 women and men in recognition of their contribution to the rights of women in New Zealand or to women's issues in New Zealand, or both.

== See also ==
- Category:New Zealand suffragists
- Women in New Zealand
- Women's history#Australia and New Zealand
- Women's suffrage
- History of voting in New Zealand
- List of suffragists and suffragettes
- Timeline of women's suffrage
- List of women's rights activists
- Women's suffrage organisations
