= Resilience (sculpture) =

Work of art in Queensland, Australia

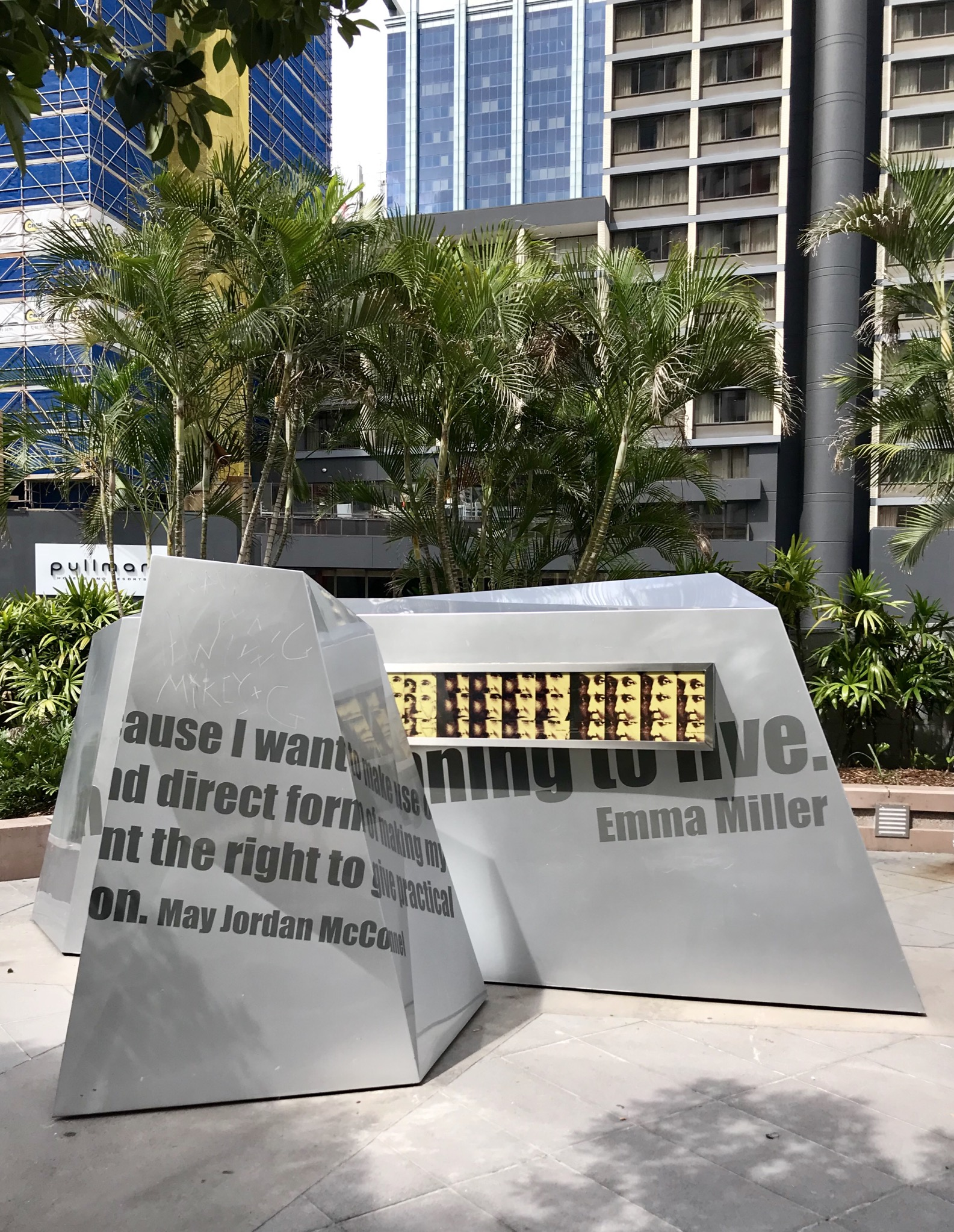
- Artist: Cida de Aragon and Steffen Lehmann
- Year: 2007
- Type: concrete, metal, glass
- Location: Brisbane, Queensland, Australia; 27°28′04″S 153°01′24″E

Resilience is a sculpture located in Brisbane, Queensland, Australia. It honours the efforts of Queensland's women who worked to achieve women's suffrage in the state.

The sculpture is located in Emma Miller Place, and was unveiled in 2007 to mark the first vote by women in an election in the State of Queensland in 1907, and the centenary of women's suffrage in Queensland in 2005. It was designed by Brazilian artist Cida de Aragon, in collaboration with Steffen Lehmann.

The sculpture is an abstract work which uses text placed on an angle, and angled glass screens. The overall shape of the artwork resembles a cross, referencing the "X" a voter uses on a ballot paper.

In 2008 Resilience was displayed at the Venice Biennale of Architecture.

== See also ==
- List of monuments and memorials to women's suffrage
