= Statues of Dorothy Tangney and Enid Lyons =

Statues in Canberra, Australia

Coordinates: 35.30233°S 149.13087°E

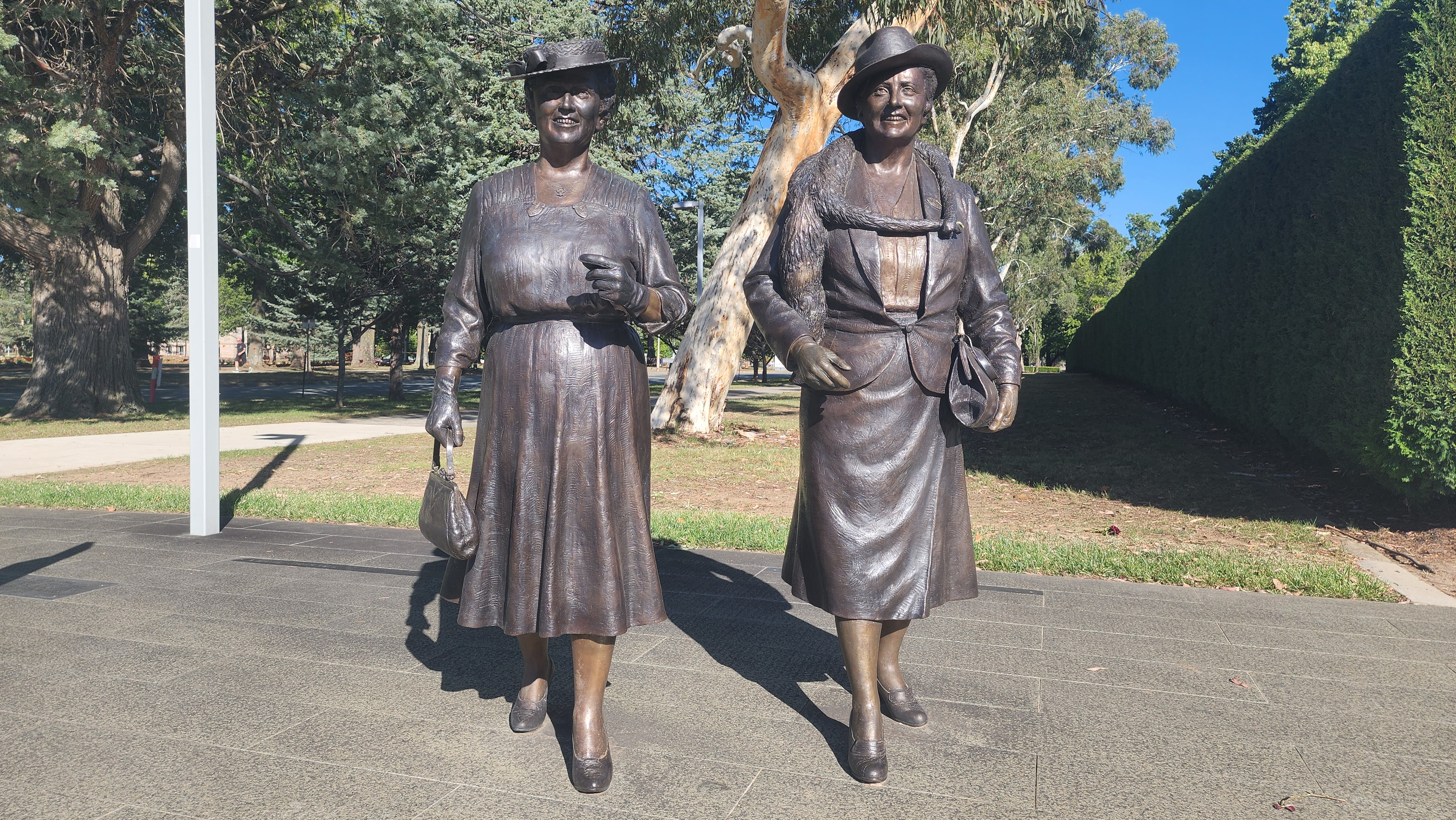
Statues of Dorothy Tangney (left) and Enid Lyons (right) on the north west corner of House of Representatives Garden walking towards Old Parliament House.

The Statues of Dorothy Tangney and Enid Lyons are located near Old Parliament House in Canberra, Australia. The bronze statues honour the women's contributions to Australia: Dorothy Tangney was Australia's first woman senator, and Enid Lyons was the first woman elected to the House of Representatives. The statues are the first statues of women to be erected in the parliamentary zone in Canberra.

In November 2021, Melbourne-based sculptor Lis Johnson was commissioned to create the statues; the design was inspired by a photograph of the women walking into Parliament House together on their first day of parliament in September 1943. In December 2021 it was proposed that the statues be located at the north-east corner of Old Parliament House, near the Ladies Rose Garden and the Centenary of Women’s Suffrage Commemorative Fountain.

The statues were unveiled on 8 March 2023 by Minister for Territories Kristy McBain, who was the first female elected to the seat of Eden-Monaro. Members of the Lyons and Tangney families were also present.
