= List of monuments and memorials to women's suffrage =

Women's suffrage refers to the right of a woman to vote in an election. This right was often not included in the original suffrage legislation of a state or country, resulting in both men and women campaigning to introduce legislation to enable women to vote. Actions included writing letters to newspapers and legislators, compiling petitions, holding marches and rallies and carrying out acts of violence. Women were on occasion arrested for these actions and held in jail, during which time some went on hunger strikes, refusing to eat for the duration of their incarceration.

Monuments and memorials to women's suffrage have been constructed around the world in recognition of the bravery and strength of the women who campaigned for voting rights, and the achievement of having the legislation passed.

== Australia ==
Name	Location	Year	Notes
Statue of Emma Miller	Brisbane	1993	Commemorates the contribution of a leading suffragist
Centenary of Western Australian Women's Suffrage Memorial	Perth	1998	Marks the centenary of women's suffrage in Western Australia
Centenary of Women's Suffrage mural	Lake Grace	1998	Marks the centenary of women's suffrage in Western Australia
Centenary of Women's Suffrage Gazebo	Kondinin	1999	Marks the centenary of women's suffrage in Western Australia
Centenary of Women's Suffrage Commemorative Fountain	Canberra	2003	Marks the centenary of women's suffrage in Australia
Resilience sculpture	Brisbane	2007	Marks the centenary of women's suffrage in Queensland
Great Petition sculpture	Melbourne	2008	Marks the centenary of women's suffrage in Victoria

== Canada ==
Name	Location	Year	Notes
"Women are Persons!"	Ottawa	2000	Commemorates the five suffragists who filed and won the Persons Case, enabling women to be appointed to the Senate of Canada
Monument to the Suffragettes	Quebec City	2012	Commemorates the three suffragists who campaigned for women's suffrage in Quebec

== New Zealand ==
Name	Location	Year	Notes
New Lynn Suffrage Memorial Mural	Auckland	1993 (later damaged) 2012 (replacement)	Marks the centenary of women's suffrage in New Zealand
Auckland Women's Suffrage Memorial	Auckland	1993	Commemorates Auckland suffragists
Kate Sheppard National Memorial	Christchurch	1993	Commemorates the lives of New Zealand's leading suffragists
Puketapapa Women's Suffrage Memorial	Auckland	2013	Commemorates the local women suffragists of the community

== United Kingdom ==
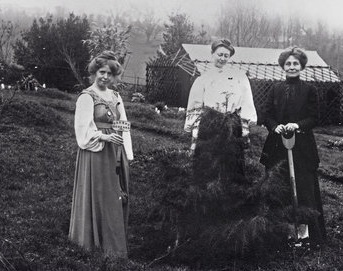
Annie Kenney to the left, Mary Blathwayt at centre and Emmeline Pankhurst, with the spade, at Eagle House in 1910

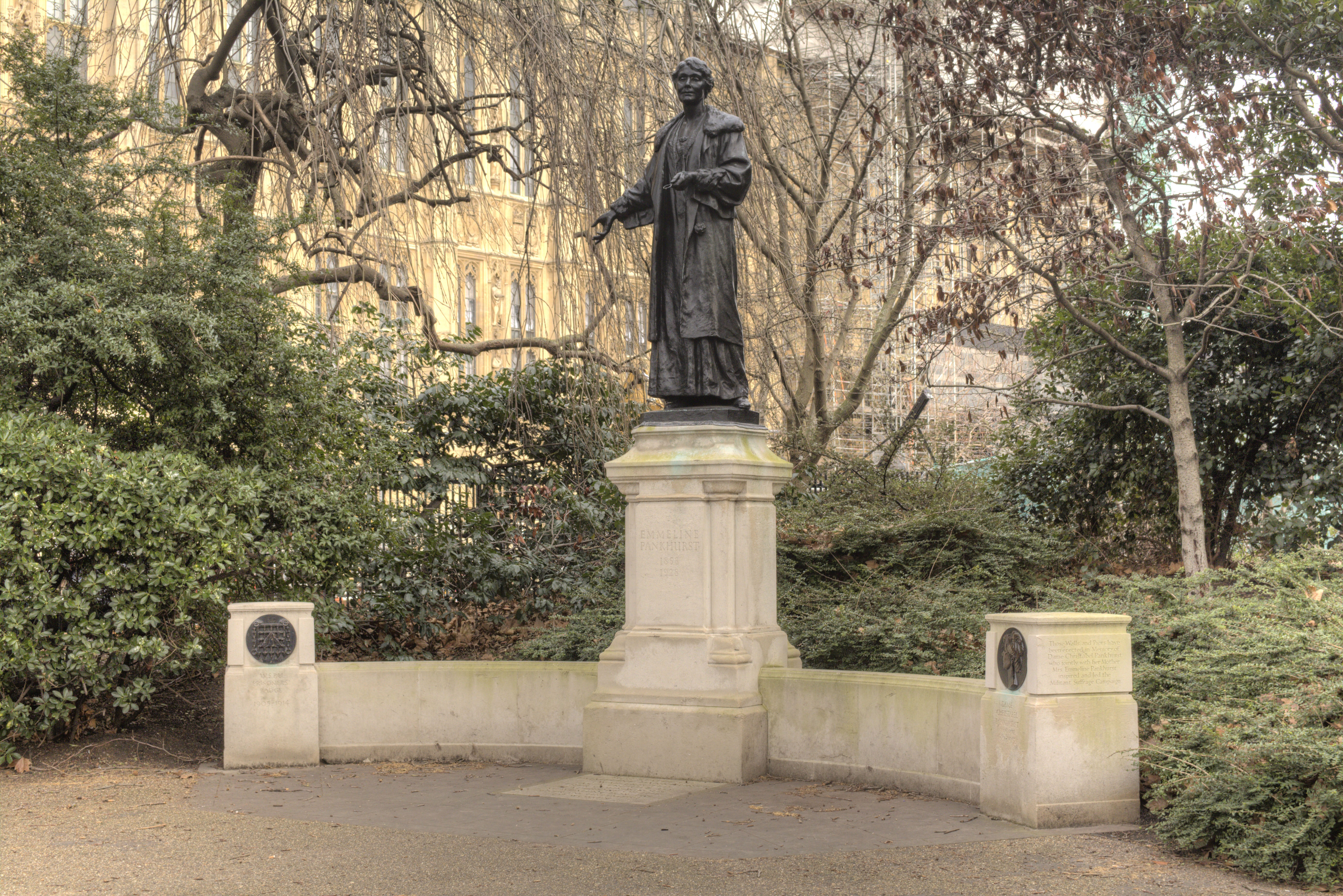
Emmeline and Christabel Pankhurst Memorial, Victoria Tower Gardens

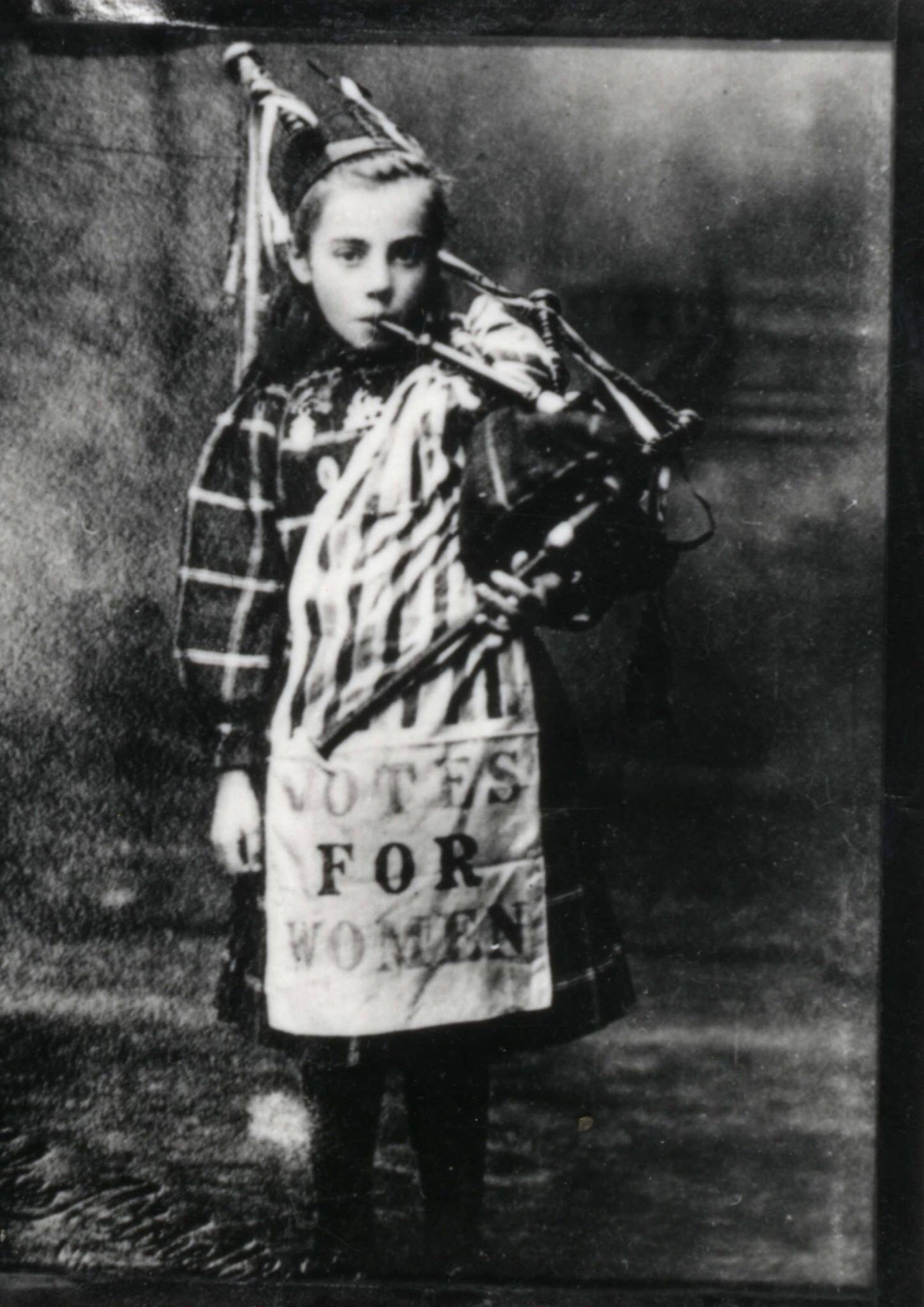
Bessie Watson, the youngest Scottish suffragette (aged 9)

Name	Location	Year	Artist	Notes
Annie's Arboretum	Eagle House, Batheaston	1909–1913 (destroyed in the 1960s)	Emily and Colonel Linley Blathwayt	Commemorated c. 60 suffragists and suffragettes
The Suffrage Oak	Glasgow	1918	Scottish suffragists	Oak tree planted to mark the passing of the Representation of the People Act 1918.
Emmeline and Christabel Pankhurst Memorial	London	1930	Arthur George Walker	Commemorates the lives of two leading suffragists
Suffragette Memorial	London	1970	Lorne McKean and Edwin Russell with Paul Paget	Commemorates the bravery of the suffragists
The Pankhurst Parlour	Manchester	1987	—N/a	Historical site and memorial
Sylvia Pankhurst (artwork)	London	2011	?	Commemorates the contribution of a leading suffragist
Alice Hawkins (statue)	Leicester	2018	Sean Hedges-Quinn	Commemorates the life of a leading local suffragist
Millicent Fawcett (statue)	London	2018	Gillian Wearing	Commemorates the contribution of a leading suffragist
Emily Wilding Davison (statue)	Morpeth	2018	Ray Lonsdale	A welded steel statue portraying the suffragette tipping over a bowl of food, in reference to her hunger strike
Rise up, Women (Emmeline Pankhurst statue)	Manchester	2018	Hazel Reeves	Commemorates the suffragettes' leader in the city of her birth
Annie Kenney (statue)	Oldham	2018	Denise Dutton	Commemorates the only working-class woman to hold a senior position in the suffragette movement
Bessie Watson (memorial plaque)	Edinburgh	2019		Commemorates the youngest Scottish girl (age 9) in the suffragette movement

== United States ==
Name	Location	Year	Notes
Portrait Monument to Lucretia Mott, Elizabeth Cady Stanton, and Susan B. Anthony	Washington, D.C.	1921	Commemorates the lives of leading suffragists of the United States
Statue of Esther Hobart Morris	Cheyenne, Wyoming	1953	Commemorates the life of one of Wyoming's leading suffragists
Minnesota Woman Suffrage Memorial	Saint Paul	2000	Commemorates the women who campaigned for the state legislature to ratify the Nineteenth Amendment to the United States Constitution, to give women the right to vote. Minnesota was the 15th state to ratify the amendment, doing so in 1919.
Tennessee Woman Suffrage Memorial	Knoxville	2006	Commemorates the women who campaigned for the state legislature to ratify the Nineteenth Amendment to the United States Constitution, to give women the right to vote. Tennessee was the final state to ratify the amendment, doing so in 1920.
Belmont-Paul Women's Equality National Monument	Washington, D.C.	2016	Commemorates the headquarters of the National Woman's Party, a key political organization in the fight for women's suffrage, and two of its leaders, Alva Belmont and Alice Paul.
Women's Rights Pioneers Monument	New York, New York	2020	Commemorates Elizabeth Cady Stanton, Susan B. Anthony, Sojourner Truth, and all of the women involved in the women's suffrage movement. This is the first statue in Central Park representing historical women and was organized by Monumental Women.
Stand	Lexington, Kentucky, near the intersection of Vine and Mill Streets	2020	Statue by Barbara Grygutis celebrating the 100th anniversary of the passing of the Nineteenth Amendment to the United States Constitution. The statue consists of the silhouettes of five generic, unnamed suffragists.
Turning Point Suffragist Memorial	Lorton, Virginia	2021	Monument to American suffragists that stands in close proximity to Occoquan Workhouse, a prison where 168 suffragists were held during the Silent Sentinels voting rights demonstrations in the late 1910s.
On the Wings of Change	Chicago, Illinois	2021	Monument to suffrage leaders who worked in Chicago created by artist Diosa (Jasmina Cazacu) on the Wabash Arts Corridor. The ten women featured in the mural are: Jane Addams, Myra Bradwell, Mary Livermore, Catharine Waugh McCulloch, Agnes Nestor, Grace Wilbur Trout, Mary Fitzbutler Waring, Ida B. Wells, Frances Willard, and Fannie Barrier Williams.
Women's Suffrage National Monument	Washington, DC	TBD	Forthcoming monument authorized by a 2020 act of Congress.

== See also ==
- Elizabeth Cady Stanton House, Seneca Falls, New York
- Elizabeth Cady Stanton House, Tenafly, New Jersey
- Kate Sheppard House, Christchurch, New Zealand
- Paulsdale, Mount Laurel Township, New Jersey, birthplace and childhood home of Alice Paul
- Susan B. Anthony Birthplace Museum, Adams, Massachusetts
- Susan B. Anthony Childhood House, Battenville, New York
- Susan B. Anthony House, Rochester, New York
- Women's Rights National Historical Park, Seneca County, New York
  - M'Clintock House, site of the writing of the 1848 Declaration of Sentiments
  - Wesleyan Methodist Church, site of the 1848 Seneca Falls Convention

== Bibliography ==
- McIntosh, Anthony (11 December 2018), Deeds Not Words: commemorating the women's suffrage movement through statues, Art UK
