= William Geoffrey Cahill =

Commissioner William Geoffrey Cahill CMG, VD
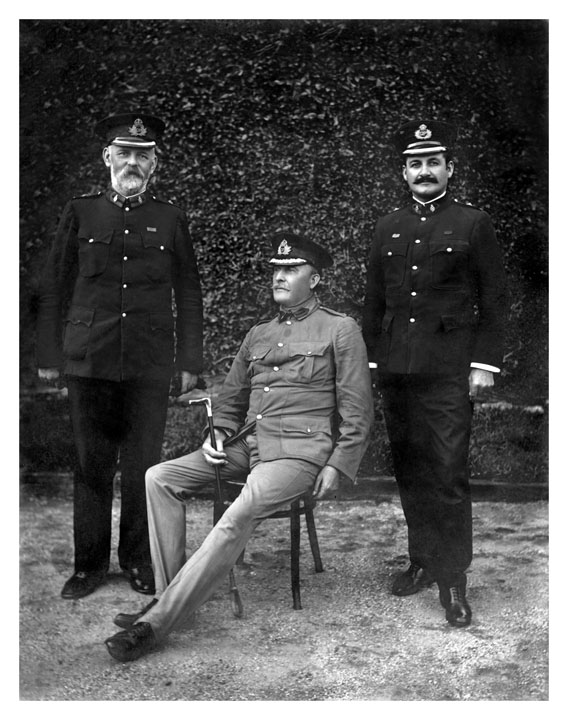
- Commissioner Cahill, seated, circa 1905

Commissioner of the Queensland Police Service
- In office 1905–1916
- Preceded by: William Parry-Okeden
- Succeeded by: Frederic Urquhart

Personal details
- Born: 7 November 1854 Strokestown, County Roscommon, Ireland
- Died: 25 April 1931 (aged 76) Newmarket, Queensland, Australia
- Profession: Police officer, soldier

Military service
- Allegiance: Colony of Queensland
- Branch/service: Queensland Volunteer Rifles
- Years of service: 1885–1905
- Rank: Major
- Awards: Companion of the Order of St Michael and St George; Volunteer Officers' Decoration

William Geoffrey Cahill, CMG, VD (7 November 1854 – 25 April 1931) was a soldier, officer and Queensland Police Commissioner in Queensland, Australia

== Early life ==
William Geoffrey Cahill was born 7 November 1854 in Strokestown, County Roscommon, Ireland. He studied at Strokestown National School and served in the Royal Irish Constabulary. He emigrated with his wife Lavinia, born Bernie, to Maryborough in Queensland where they arrived on 2 December 1878.

== Public service career ==
After his arrival in Australia, Cahill worked in the public service of Queensland in various positions before becoming the Queensland Police Commissioner in Queensland on 1 April 1905. He was appointed as Protector of Aborigines on 7 September 1905.

As police commissioner, Cahill provided government-paid uniforms and better pensions for staff. He wrote a manual for police officers, attaching great importance to efficiency of the service, the weapons and the ammunition, modernised the education and devoted himself to the improved awareness of criminal crimes. In his role, he was also responsible for the public roads, licensing of liquor, the monitoring of betting and child protection.

The general strike in Brisbane in 1912 was a critical moment in his career. The conservative Premier Digby Denham directed Cahill to maintain law and order. Despite Cahill's ban on an assembly of strikers, the strike leaders ignored the order and organised an assembly on 2 February 1912. Mounted on a horse, Cahill responded by leading a baton charge down Albert Street to disperse the demonstrators. Cahill was thrown from his horse during the charge; it is claimed that Emma Miller (a leading trade unionist) stabbed his horse with her hatpin. Although the Denham government supported Cahill's actions, the Australian Labor Party said they would dismiss Cahill when they won government.

In the 1915 Queensland state election held in May, the conservative government was voted out and Thomas Joseph Ryan of the Labour Party came to power. Despite their previous threats, Cahill remained as police commissioner, despite one of the 1912 strike leaders, David Bowman, becoming the minister responsible for police. In March 1916, Bowman was replaced by John Huxham, who supported the establishment of a police union with which Cahill strongly disagreed. In December 1916, Cahill was allowed early retirement on the grounds of ill health.

== Military service ==
Cahill also served since 1885 in the military, the Brisbane Volunteer Rifle Corps of Queensland Volunteer Rifles, where he was appointed captain in 1887 and major in 1889. In 1894 to 1895, he commanded the voluntary infantry during the absence overseas of Andrew Joseph Thynne. Cahill continued to serve in the volunteer militia until he resigned on his appointment as Police Commissioner in 1905.

== Later life ==
Cahill died on 25 April 1931 at Newmarket in Brisbane. His funeral was held two days later at St Stephen's Cathedral and proceeded to the Nudgee Catholic Cemetery.

== Medal ==
Cahill received numerous honours, such as the Volunteer Officers' Decoration in 1911, appointment as a Companion of the Order of St Michael and St George in December 1912, and was twice with the aide-de-camp during the period from 1912 to 1916.
