= Emma Miller (suffragist) =

Founder of Australian Labour Party (1839–1917)

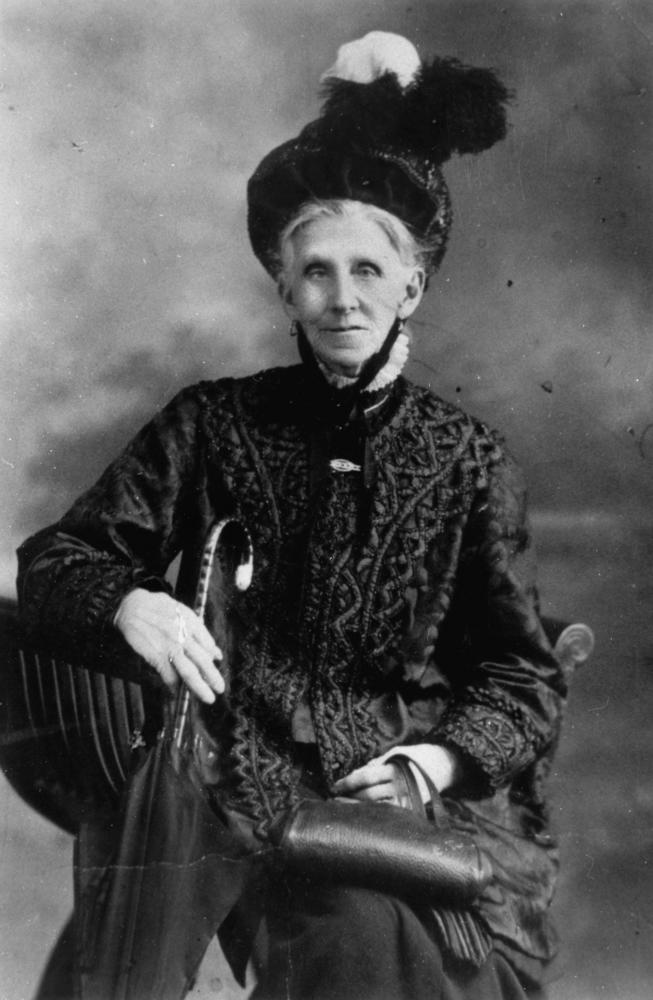
- Born: Emma Holmes; 26 June 1839; Chesterfield, England
- Died: 22 January 1917 (aged 77); Toowoomba, Queensland, Australia
- Occupations: Trade union organiser and suffragist

Emma Miller (26 June 1839 – 22 January 1917) was an English-born Australian pioneer trade union organiser, suffragist, and key figure in organisations which led to the founding of the Australian Labor Party in Brisbane, Queensland, Australia.

== Early life ==
Miller was born on 26 June 1839 in Chesterfield, England, the eldest of four children born to Martha Holmes, née Hollingworth, and her husband Daniel. Her parents had strong Unitarian beliefs and were active in the Chartist movement.

At the age of 18 she eloped and married a bookkeeper, Jabez Mycroft Silcock. They had four children together; however, Silcock died and Miller took up sewing to support the family. In 1874 Miller married William Calderwood, and they migrated with Miller's children to Queensland, arriving in 1879. Calderwood died in 1880, and Miller married Andrew Miller in Brisbane in 1886.

== Trade union activism ==
In Queensland, Miller worked as a gentlemen's shirt maker and seamstress. Along with May Jordan McConnel, she formed the first women's union in Brisbane, the Brisbane Women's Union, in September 1890 supported by a campaign by William Lane in the Brisbane Worker newspaper. As a seamstress she gave evidence at the 1891 Royal Commission into Shops, Factories and Workshops, that highlighted the existence of many sweatshops that exploited women workers. Through this period Miller was an active participant in the Early Closing Association.

With the great strikes of the 1890s, Miller was active in supporting the 1891 Australian shearers' strike and in setting up the Prisoners' Relief Fund for the twelve arrested strike leaders. While William Lane chose to set up in 1892 the New Australia community in Paraguay along socialist lines which attracted many labour activists, Miller believed Lane was "opting out of the struggle" and became a foundation member of the Workers' Political Organisation, a forerunner of the Australian Labor Party in Queensland. She became colloquially known as "Mother Miller", as she was the most dominant female figure in the Queensland labour movement.

== Women's enfranchisement ==
Miller was a founding member of the Women's Equal Franchise Association, which was established in 1894 and almost immediately suffered a split. Leontine Cooper left to form the Women's Franchise League, alleging that the WEFA was too close to the labour movement which could hinder women's enfranchisement. Miller remained and was elected president. She held the position until 1905, when the organisation disbanded on the successful attainment of women's suffrage. Despite the differences, Miller, Cooper and the conservative Women's Christian Temperance Union often worked together on suffrage issues.

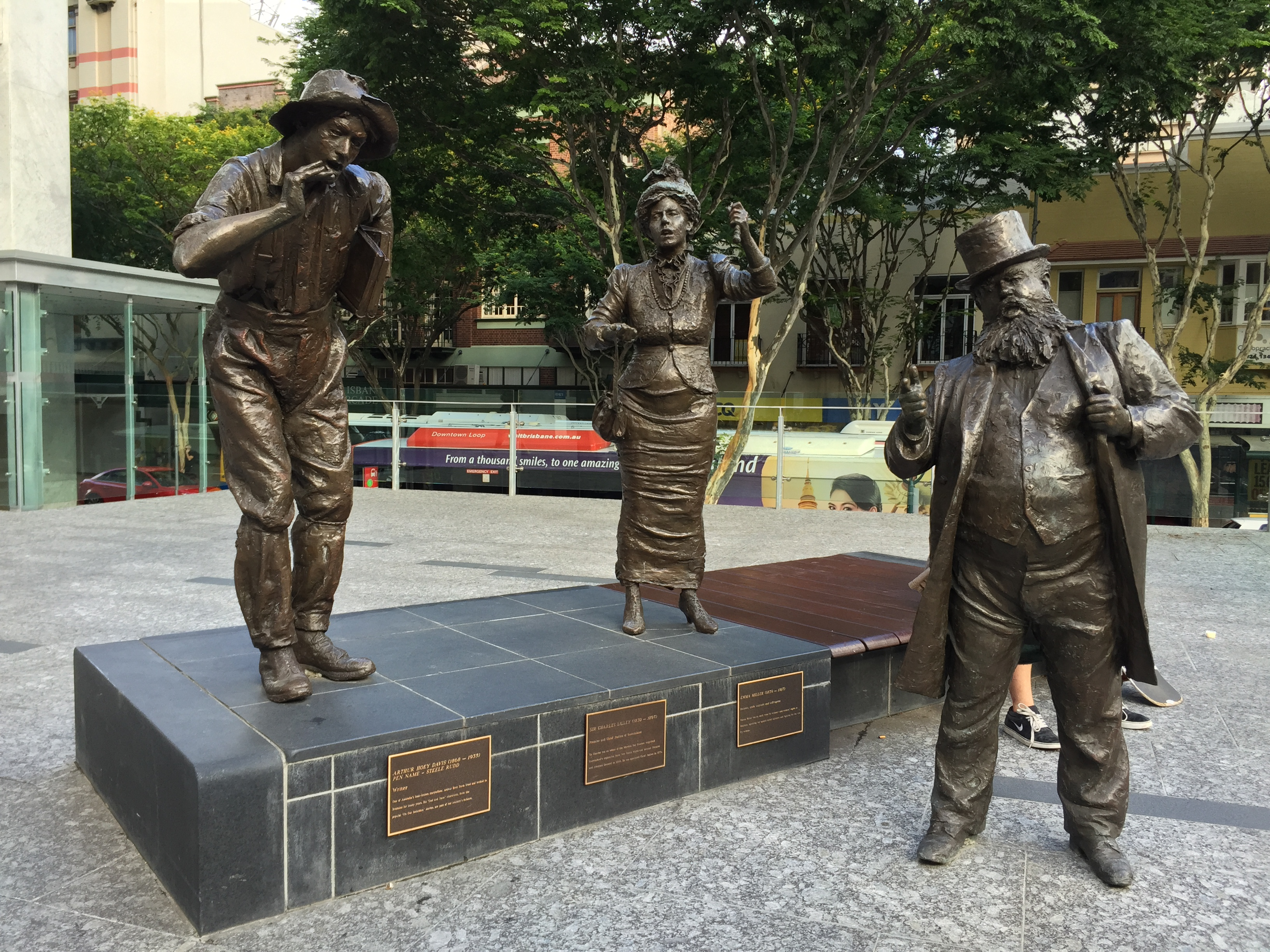
Emma Miller statue in King George Square, Brisbane

Women were enfranchised under the Federal Electoral Act on 9 April 1902, becoming the first women of the world to win the right to vote for a national parliament. (Women in New Zealand won the right to vote in colonial elections in 1893). Members of the Women's Equal Franchise Association actively canvassed for the women's vote for the December 1903 Federal election, by forming the Women Workers' Political Organisation with Miller as president. After the Federal election Miller stood down as president, but became President of the Political Labour Council in Brisbane. Women were granted the vote for the Queensland parliament on 25 January 1905, although not the right to stand for parliament. The following year Emma Miller embarked on a tour of western Queensland under the auspices of the Australian Workers' Union, speaking at large public rallies and helping to form local branches of the Workers' Political Organisation and the Women Workers' Political Organisation.

== Later life ==
=== Brisbane General Strike ===
During the 1912 Brisbane General Strike for the right to organise trade unions, Miller led a contingent of women to Parliament House. During the march, the women were charged by horse-mounted police with batons, and Miller thrust her hat-pin into the Police Commissioner's horse, causing the horse to throw him and injure him severely.

=== Women's Peace Army ===
Miller was also involved in anti-conscription activism over the course of World War I. She joined the Women's Peace Army when Cecilia John and Adela Pankhurst visited Brisbane in 1915, and was elected president. The following year she attended the Australian Peace Alliance conference in Melbourne, and is reputed to have attended the Yarra Bank where she denounced militarism from her soapbox. The NO campaign against the first conscription ballot on 28 October 1916 was a success, attributed by many historians to the strong women's anti-conscription campaign.

== Death ==
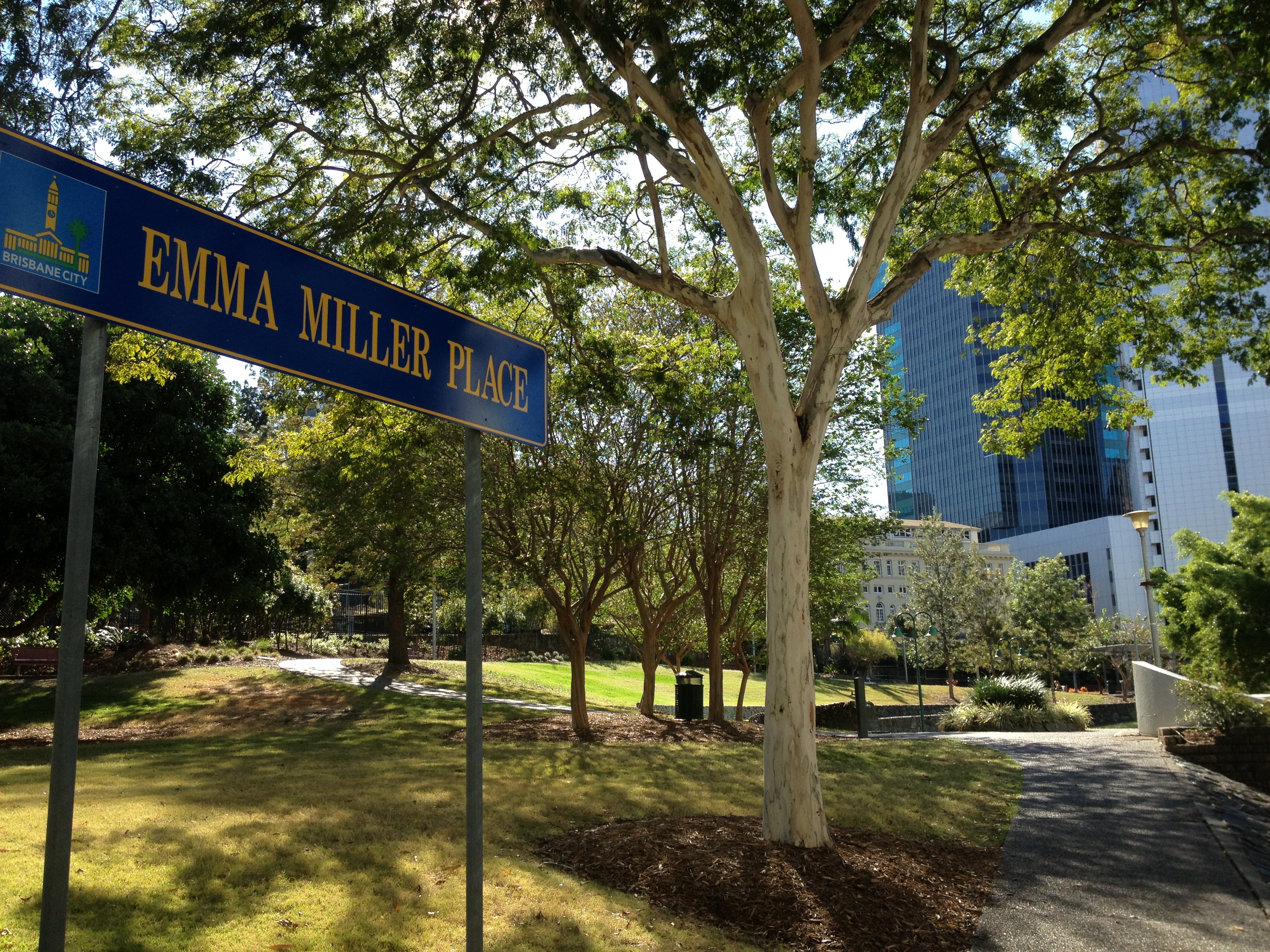
Emma Miller Place, 2013

In January 1917 Miller travelled to Toowoomba for several weeks rest. At her last public meeting in the Toowoomba Botanical Gardens she impressed on the women present the "need to play a part in the Labor movement as it meant as much to them as the men". Two days later Emma Miller died of cancer. The flag at Brisbane Trades Hall was flown at half mast for the "mother of the Australian Labor Party". A state funeral was offered but was refused by her surviving son. Miller was buried at Toowong Cemetery.

== Legacy ==
State Library of Queensland holds an illuminated address on parchment presented to Sir Arthur Morgan, Premier of Queensland, July 1905 to commemorate the granting of women's suffrage in Queensland. The document is personally signed by Miller in her role as President of the Woman’s Equal Franchise Association.

In August 1917 the Worker magazine published a poem in memorial to Miller. In 1922, a marble bust of her by James Laurence Watts was unveiled at the Queensland Council of Unions. A statue is located in King George Square in Brisbane, and there is also an Emma Miller Place located off Roma Street in Brisbane. In 1987 the Queensland Council of Unions established the Emma Miller Award, which is presented each year to women who have made an outstanding contribution to their union.

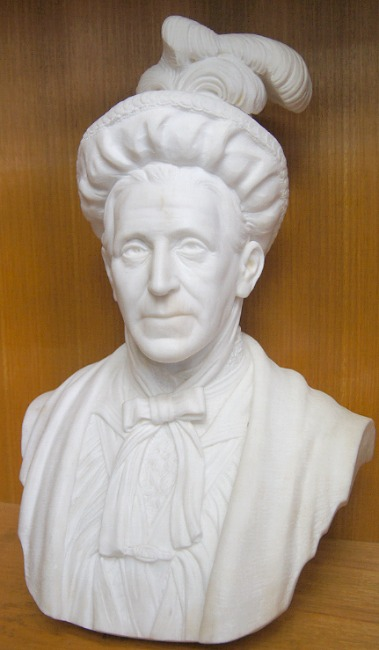
Bust of Miller held at Queensland Council of Unions

In 2003, Miller's life story was featured in the exhibition "A Lot on Her Hands", presented by the Australian Workers' Heritage Centre.

The electoral district of Miller created in the 2017 Queensland state electoral redistribution was named after her.

== See also ==
- History of feminism
- List of suffragists and suffragettes
