= Auckland Women's Suffrage Memorial =

Mural in Auckland, New Zealand

- Artists: Jan Morrison; Claudia Pond Eyley
- Year: 1993
- Medium: Mural
- Location: Khartoum Place, Auckland, New Zealand; 36.8507°S 174.7657°E

The Auckland Women's Suffrage Memorial is a public mural designed by artists Jan Morrison and Claudia Pond Eyley for the centenary of women securing the vote in New Zealand. It is one of the first and few dedicated suffrage memorials in New Zealand. It is located at Khartoum Place, Auckland CBD, on the stairs that connect Kitchener and Lorne Streets and lead to Auckland Art Gallery.

== Background ==
The site of the memorial was part of an area occupied by multiple iwi including Te Waiōhua and Ngāti Whātua. In 1840, it was part of the land offered to the Crown by Ngāti Whātua.

In 1893, female suffrage was established. In 1993, the Suffrage Centennial Trust / Whakatū Wahine was established on the centenary of the occasion to promote public education on suffrage. Auckland artist Jan Morrison approached the Trust and Auckland City Council for funding for the creation of a mural which would commemorate the centenary. Khartoum Place was selected as the location and Morrison completed the mural with the help of fellow feminist artist Claudia Pond Eyley. The project was community-led with a specific focus on the women of northern New Zealand who contributed to the movement.

The memorial opened on 20 September 1993, the day following the opening of the Kate Sheppard National Memorial in Christchurch. The governor-general, Dame Catherine Tizard, and president of Ireland, Mary Robinson, unveiled the mural. They were both the first women to hold their respective positions, and from 1983 to 1990, Tizard was the first female mayor of Auckland. The unveiling included a navy band, a procession down Queen Street and a pōwhiri.

== Structure ==
The mural consists of 12 panels made up of 2,000 colourful tiles. It is a two-dimensional piece of art, but a three-dimensional space that wraps around and includes a water feature. Across the first five panels unfurls Kate Sheppard's scroll, which signifies the women's suffrage petition signed by over 25,000 women across New Zealand. The third panel displays white camellias, the flower that was gifted to members of parliament in support of the women's franchise bill. Bordering the central panels are Māori kete (flax baskets), symbolising a weaving together of cultures, and koru, to signify transformation and growth. The tenth panel, on the uppermost section of the stairs, shows illustrations of iconic motifs of Auckland—Rangitoto, the pōhutukawa tree, and the huia–and the Southern Cross to represent New Zealand as a whole.

Painted on the eighth and ninth panels are eleven women significant to the suffrage movement in New Zealand:

1. Amey Daldy – president of Auckland Women's Franchise League
2. Anne Ward – first president of the Women's Christian Temperance Union
3. Annie Schnackenberg – missionary and president of the Women's Christian Temperance Union
4. Elizabeth Caradus – suffragist
5. Elizabeth Yates – first female mayor in New Zealand and the British Empire
6. Fanny Brown – one of the first seven women enrolled to vote
7. Ada Wells – inaugural national secretary of the National Council of Women
8. Lizzie Rattray – journalist.
9. Matilda Allsopp – one of the first seven women enrolled to vote
10. Meri Te Tai Mangakahia – first recorded woman to address Te Kotahitanga.
11. An anonymous young New Zealand university graduate, who studied in England

Four women are depicted with bicycles, which were the mode of transportation that women would use to gather signatures from more rural locations.

== Changes and controversies ==
The mural's placement and importance have been contested subjects since its inception. It has come under threat of redevelopment many times.

=== 2005 ===
In 2005, Auckland City Council held a competition for a $2 million upgrade of Khartoum Place, with none of the entrants intending to keep the memorial. Original artists Morrison and Pond Eyley were given the final say, to which they declined its re-siting or demolition.

=== 2006 ===
In 2006, the Auckland art fraternity tried to have the mural removed, stating it lacked artistry and blocked the view to the Auckland Art Gallery. Four influential women—Dame Catherine Tizard, Dame Georgina Kirby, Dame Dorothy Winstone and Dame Thea Muldoon—objected. They argued, alongside the National Council of Women, that the memorial must stay, and that the mural's historical importance was being ignored. Writer and art curator Hamish Keith, arguing for the removal of the stairs to open up the space to the newly extended Auckland Art Gallery, likened the mural to a makeshift urinal. In response, Brian Rudman wrote in the New Zealand Herald:

"To them, it's a folk-art excrescence, polluting the front door of their newly upgraded temple of high art."

Women in Auckland and multiple associated organisations created an online petition to save the memorial. In 2012, the nascent Auckland Council decided to upgrade Khartoum Place without demolishing or moving the memorial.

=== 2015/2016 ===
In 2015, a group of architects and gallery owners again attempted to have the mural moved. They claimed the mural was too "folksy" and "crafty", and that the gallery deserved a better staircase leading up to it. The National Council of Women then petitioned through the unitary plan process to have the memorial protected as a heritage item. In 2016, their petitioning resulted in the memorial being listed as a Category A historic heritage place in the Auckland Council's unitary plan.

=== Name change ===
In 2016, the Waitematā Local Board agreed to rename Lower Khartoum Place, where the memorial sits, to Te Hā o Hine Suffrage Place, to associate the site more strongly with the women's suffrage movement in recognition of the memorial's importance. The name was gifted by Ngāti Whātua, and references the Māori proverb: Me aro koe ki te hā o Hine ahu one, which can be interpreted as 'pay heed to the dignity of women'.

=== Heritage listing ===
In 2022, the Auckland Women's Suffrage Memorial was listed by Heritage New Zealand as a category 1 historic place. Heritage New Zealand noted that the memorial had great cultural, social, historical and physical significance, and that persistent campaigns to protect it showed the public esteem for the artwork.
