= Monument to the Suffragettes =

Coordinates: 46°48′30″N 71°12′48″W

The Monument to the Suffragettes is a public artwork located in Quebec City, Canada.

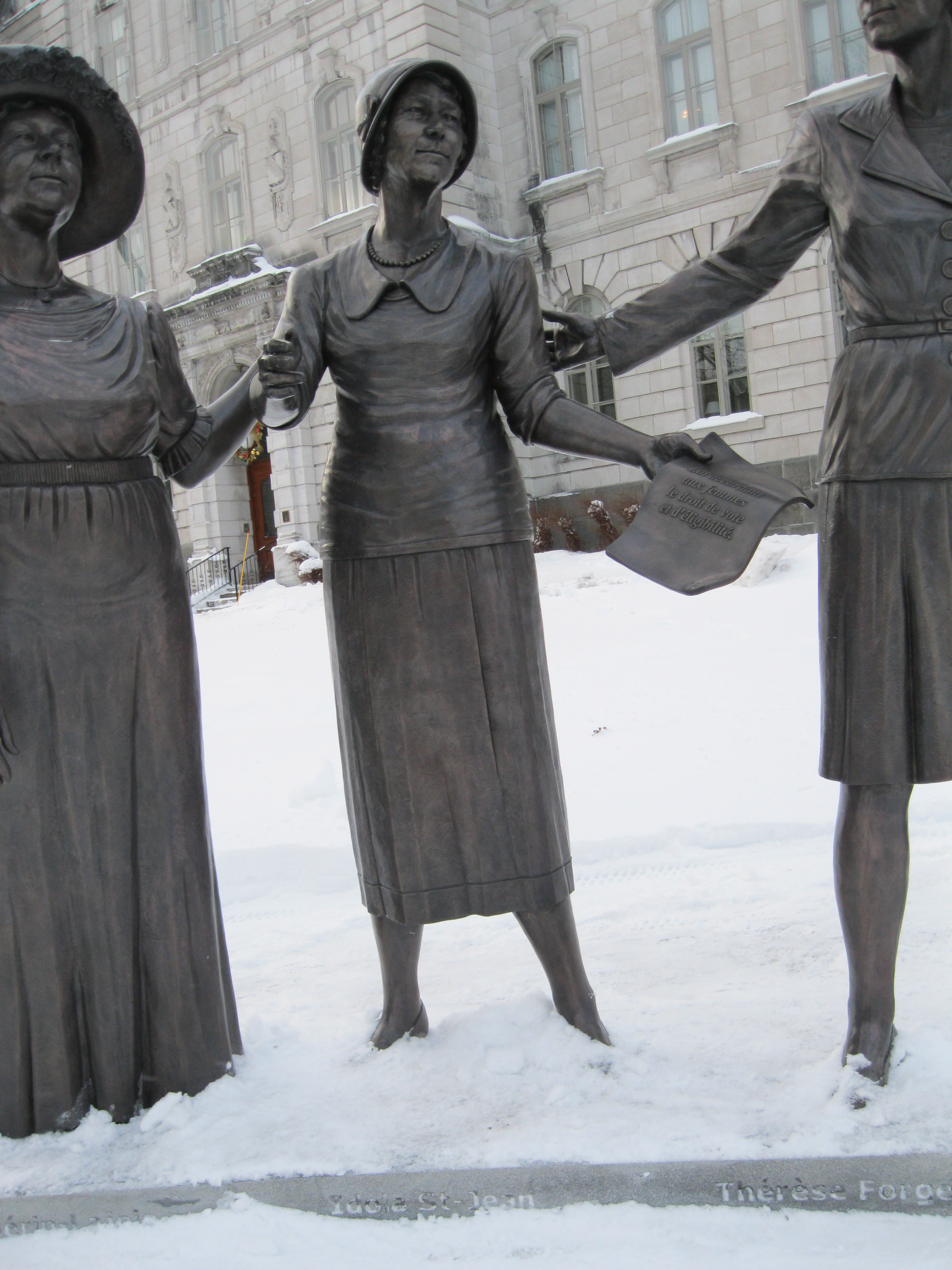
Monument to the Suffragettes

The memorial is a sculpture of four key women in Quebec's political history: three suffragettes, Marie Lacoste Gérin-LaJoie, Idola Saint-Jean and Thérèse Forget-Casgrain; and Marie-Claire Kirkland, the first woman elected to the National Assembly.

The statues were scuipted by Jules Lasalle and unveiled on 5 December 2012 by the Premier of Quebec, Pauline Marois.

== See also ==
- List of monuments and memorials to women's suffrage
