= Centenary of Women's Suffrage mural =

Mural in Lake Grace, Western Australia

The Centenary of Women's Suffrage mural is a public artwork located in the town of Lake Grace, Western Australia. It honours 48 women who contributed to the development of the area from the time of European settlement until the present day.

The mural was painted in 1998 by a group of local artists as part of commemorations for the centenary of women's suffrage in the State of Western Australia. It was funded by a grant from the state's fund for women's suffrage commemorations. It depicts women from a range of backgrounds, including settlers, community builders, professionals, homemakers, activists, farmers and students.

== See also ==
- List of monuments and memorials to women's suffrage
- Suffrage in Australia
