= Steffen Lehmann =

German architect (born 1963)

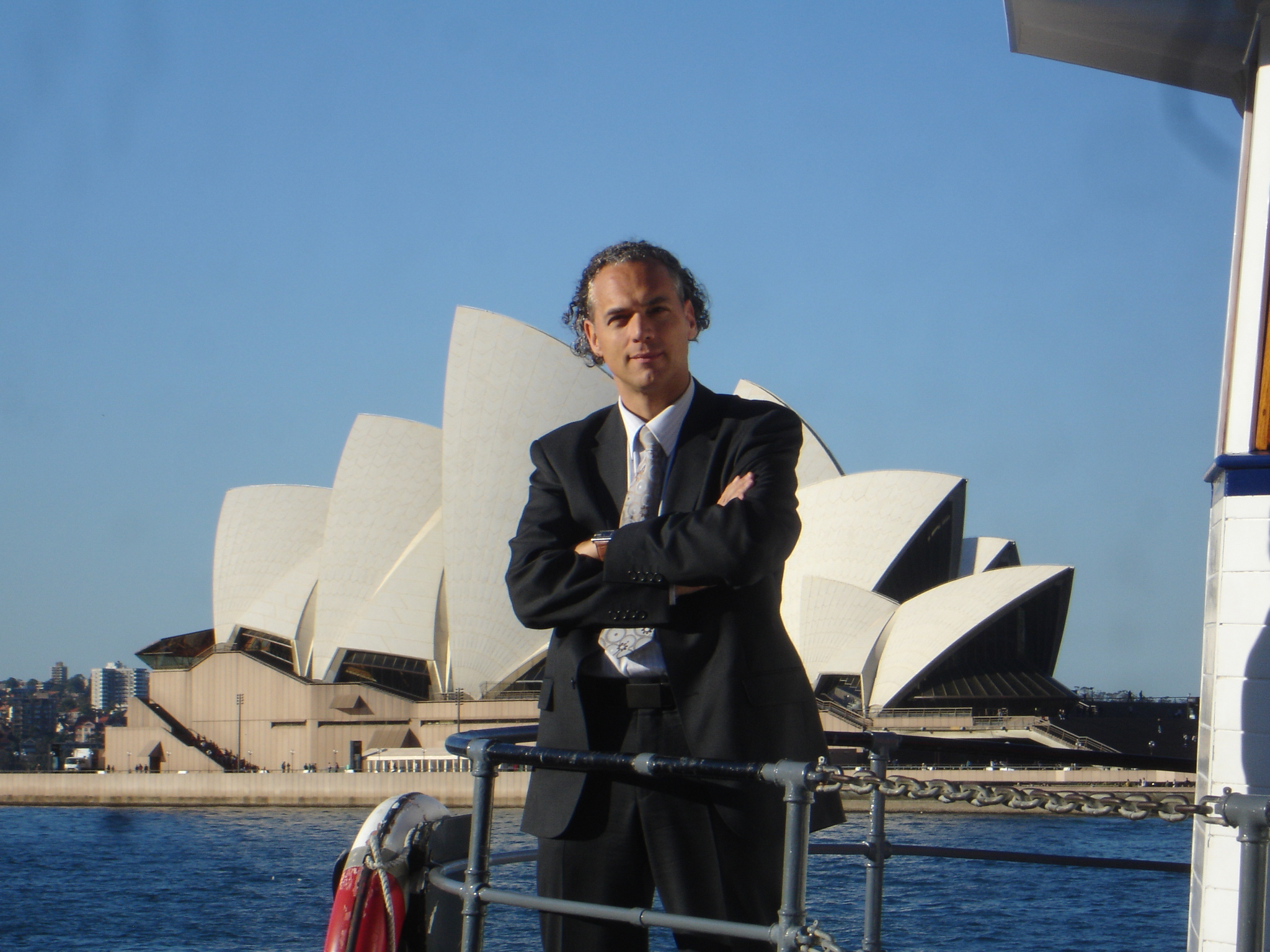
- Steffen Lehmann
- Born: 19 June 1963 (age 62); Stuttgart, West Germany
- Occupations: Architect and urban designer

Steffen Lehmann (born 19 June 1963) is a German-born architect and urban designer.

== Biography ==
Lehmann held the UNESCO Chair in Sustainable Urban Development for Asia and the Pacific from 2008 to 2010. He now advises UNESCO ex-officio. He was the Professorial Chair in the School of Architecture and Built Environment at the University of Newcastle in New South Wales from 2006 to 2010, and the Professorial Chair of Architecture and Head of Discipline at Queensland University of Technology from 2002 to 2006. Lehmann is the founding director of the s_Lab Space Laboratory for Architectural Research and Design (Sydney-Berlin), which he opened in 1993. He is currently the Professor of Sustainable Architecture and Co-Director of the Cluster for Sustainable Cities at the University of Portsmouth.

Since 2006 Lehmann has been the editor of the US-based Journal of Green Building, and works as an advisor to various governments and municipalities. He holds three post-graduate degrees; after graduating from the Architectural Association School of Architecture in London (1989) he worked with James Stirling in London and with Arata Isozaki in Tokyo. He has been a juror for international design competitions, such as Leipziger Platz in Berlin, Etihad Towers in Abu Dhabi and Harmony Point in Ho-Chi-Minh City.

Lehmann is the founding Director of both the Zero Waste SA Research Centre for Sustainable Design and Behaviour at the University of South Australia (since 2010) and the China-Australia Centre for Sustainable Urban Development, an international research centre co-located at the University of South Australia and Tianjin University, China (since 2012).

During the 1990s, he was involved in the urban re-development of Berlin's city centre and has built large-scale buildings in Berlin's Potsdamer Platz, Hackescher Markt and Pariser Platz.

Lehmann is currently the Director of the interdisciplinary Urban Futures Lab, and former CEO of the Future Cities Leadership Lab Institute at University of Nevada, Las Vegas. He is also a current professor at the University of Nevada.

== Selected works ==
- During the 1990s, he was instrumental in the urban re-development of Berlin’s city centre and has built large-scale buildings in Berlin’s Potsdamer Platz, Hackescher Markt and Pariser Platz.
- 1993-2000 Buildings C2/C3, Potsdamer Platz
- 1993-1995 Factory and office building in Hartha, Dresden
- 1995-1996 House T. in Frankfurt
- 1994-2000 Quarter at the Museumsinsel, Berlin
- 1994-2000 Headquarters of German Workers Union, Berlin
- 1996-2002 French Embassy in Berlin, Pariser Platz (in collaboration with Christian de Portzamparc)
- 1998-2003 Extension to Ministry of Foreign Affairs, Berlin
- 1999-2003 Three villas at Eichenallee, Berlin
- 2006-2009 Taree Waterfront Masterplan, New South Wales, Australia
- 2009-2010 Mildura Riverside Masterplan, Victoria, Australia

== Publications ==
Selection of Publications:

- 1998/1999; Two small books: "Architekturführer Nr. 5 and Nr. 20 on Potsdamer Platz and on Quartier an der Museumsinsel", Stadtwandel Verlag; each 36 pages, texts by Ulf Meyer, www.stadtwandel.de
- 1999; Small book: "Tower of Babel: Architecture for the 3rd millennium", with Prof. Heinrich Klotz, Steffen Lehman and Prof. Wolf Prix (Coop Himmelblau); Jovis Verlag, Berlin; 48 pages, ISBN 3-931321-32-0, edited by ZDF, www.jovis.de
- 2002; Edited Book: "Rethinking: space, time & architecture: A dialogue between art and architecture", Jovis Verlag, Berlin; editor: Steffen Lehmann and Staatliche Museen zu Berlin; with essays by Brian Hatton, Steffen Lehman, Prof. H.von Amelunxen, Dr. Andres Lepik, 130 pages, Dec. 2002, ISBN 3-931321-69-X, www.jovis.de
- 2003; Book: "Der Weg Brasiliens in die Moderne, 1930 - 1955", Publisher: LIT Verlag, Muenster/Berlin, 328 pages, 300 illustrations, ISBN 3-8258-6939-3 The first complete book evaluating modern Brazilian architecture from 1930 to 1955 in German language. Dec. 2003, www.lit-verlag.de
- 2004; Editor for book: "03:04 review" Projects Review of Architecture students at QUT, Brisbane, 144 pages. Chairing Editorial Board and writing key essays. 176 pages, March 2004 QUT Publication (Brisbane). ISBN 1-74107-050-3
- 2004; Editor for book: "Urban Schools. New Typologies for School Buildings"; publication on Design Studio outcomes of Steffen Lehmann's 3rd Year studio, launched in March 2004. 106 pages. Editorial leadership and key essays.
- 2004; Editor for book: "Brisbane Towers - Brisbane Bridges. Architecture for the City"; publication on Design Studio outcomes of Steffen Lehmann's 5th Year studio. QUT Publication (Brisbane); launched Dec. 2004. 120 pages. Editorial leadership and key essays. ISBN 1-74107-079-1
- 2005; Editor for book: "Absolutely Public. Crossovers: Art and Architecture"; book on collaborative Public Arts projects and urban space in Brisbane. Images Publishing (Melbourne), launched January 2005. 124 pages, 190 illustrations. Editorial leadership and key essay. With texts by Prof. John Hartley, Prof. Jennifer Taylor, Steffen Lehman, Prof. Michael Keniger, etc. ISBN 1-86470-137-4

Recent books

- 2006: flow, Steffen Lehmann (ed.), Publisher Infinite Press, Sydney, 260 pages, ISBN 978-0-9802933-0-2
- 2009: Back to the City. Strategies for Informal Urban Interventions, Steffen Lehmann (ed.), Publisher Hatje Cantz, Berlin, 262 pages, ISBN 978-3-7757-2329-9
- 2010: The Principles of Green Urbanism. Transforming the City for Sustainability, Steffen Lehmann, Earthscan London, ISBN 978-1-84407-817-2
- 2010: Proceedings for International Conference: Sustainable Architecture and Urban Development, Lehmann, S.; Al-Qawasmi, J.; Al Waer, H. (eds), CSAAR / CIB Conference in July 2010, CSAAR Press, 2010, ISBN 978-9957-540-00-5 (volume I, 455p.); ISBN 978-9957-540-01-2 (volume II, 511p.); ISBN 978-9957-540-02-9 (volume III, 549p.); ISBN 978-9957-540-03-6 (volume IV, 503p.); (4 volumes).
- 2012: Designing for Zero Waste: Consumption, Technologies and the Built Environment, Steffen Lehmann and Robert Crocker (ed.) Earthscan/Routledge, London, ISBN 978-1-84971-435-8
- 2013: Motivating Change: Sustainable Design and Behaviour in the Built Environment, Robert Crocker and Steffen Lehmann (ed.) Earthscan/Routledge, London, ISBN 978-0-415-82978-6
