= Claudia Pond Eyley =

New Zealand artist and filmmaker

- Born: Claudia Pond; 21 June 1946 (age 80); Matamata, New Zealand
- Education: Elam School of Fine Arts, Auckland
- Known for: Painting, documentary film
- Spouse: Peter Eyley (m. 1968)

Claudia Pond Eyley (born 21 June 1946) is a New Zealand artist and filmmaker. Her works are held in the collection of the Auckland Art Gallery Toi o Tāmaki and Museum of New Zealand Te Papa Tongarewa.

== Early life ==
Claudia Pond Eyley was born in 1946 in Matamata, New Zealand.

== Education ==
Eyley has studied in Montreal, New York, and at the Auckland University Elam School of Fine Arts. Eyley was a major figure in Kingsland society circles in the 1970s and 1980s.

== Career ==
=== Art ===
She is a founding member of Visual Artists Against Nuclear Arms and a member of the Association of Women Artists. She has exhibited widely international and within New Zealand, including:

- Guest Artist, N.Z. Society of Sculptors & Painters Show in 1975
- Wellington City Art Gallery in 1985
- Unruly Practices at the Auckland City Art Gallery in 1993

She has completed mural commissions at Stokes Road (1980), Auckland University Arts Commerce (1984), Auckland High Court (1991), and collaborated with Pat Hanly for Flying Colours With Invention, Women's Suffrage Centennial collaborative project at Khartoum Place (1993).

=== Films ===
Eyley has directed four films including:

- Helen (2013), (co-directed with Dan Salmon) documentary about New Zealand's first elected woman Prime Minister, Helen Clark
- Kit & Maynie (2008), documentary about two 90-year-old peace activists who live on Waiheke Island in the Hauraki Gulf of New Zealand
- No Nukes Is Good Nukes! The Legacy of New Zealand's Grassroots Ant-Nuclear Movement (2007), documentary about New Zealand's Act of Parliament in 1987 which saw New Zealand become a nuclear free nation
- Departure and Return -The Final Journey of the Rainbow Warrior (2006), documentary about Greenpeace's ship, the Rainbow Warrior

=== Books ===
Eyley co-authored the book Helen Clark – Inside Stories with Dan Salmon. She has illustrated three children's books with author Maris O'Rouke: Lillibutt's Big Adventure; Lillibut''s Te Araroa Adventure; and Lillibutt's Australian Adventure.
