= May Jordan McConnel =

Australian trade unionist and suffragist

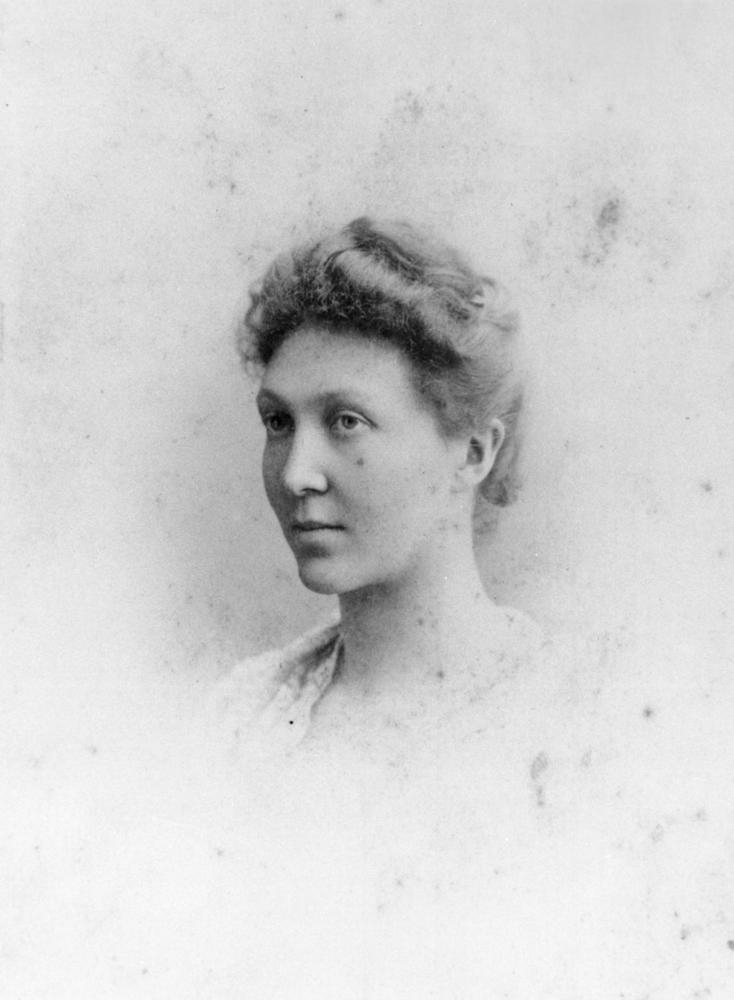
- May Jordan McConnel, circa 1890
- Born: May Emma Jordan; 6 September 1860; Brisbane, Queensland, Australia
- Died: 28 April 1929 (aged 68); California, United States
- Occupations: Trade unionist, Suffragist
- Spouse: David Rose McConnel (m. 1890)

Mary Emma Jordan McConnel (6 September 1860 – 28 April 1929) was an Australian trade unionist and suffragist. She was the first paid female trade union organiser in Queensland.

== Life ==
McConnel née Jordan was born on 6 September 1860 at George Street, Brisbane, the daughter of politician Henry Jordan and his wife, Elizabeth (née Turner). She trained as a teacher and nurse. She was secretary of the Tailoresses' Union, was heavily involved in the formation of the Brisbane Women's Union, treasurer of the Women's Equal Franchise Association, and inaugural general secretary of the women's section of the Australian Labour Federation. It was for the Labour Federation that she would begin working for as an organiser in 1890.

In March 1890, she became engaged to David Rose McConnel of Cressbook Station (first Director of the Central Technical College in Brisbane). The couple were married at Sherwood on 24 December 1890 announcing that she did not intend to relinquish her work with the Labour Federation. In February 1891 she was appointed to a Queensland Government committee to enquire into working conditions in shops, factories and workshops. Twin children, Alexander McLeod and Winifred Henry, were born prematurely on 5 August 1891 and both died at six months of age in 1892. Another unnamed son died at birth on 22 October 1892. Sons Frederic Jordan and David Ewen were born on 11 September 1894 and 15 April 1900 respectively. In March 1905, as a member of the Queensland Society for Prevention of Cruelty, she lobbied to have the legislation on neglected children amended.

The family left Brisbane in 1910 for the United Kingdom and United States. On departing, she donated their home Robgill in Indooroopilly to the Methodist Church to use for a children's home or other philanthropic purpose, resulting in Queen Alexandra Home for Children opening in 1910 with six children, but in 1912 the children's home was relocated to a larger property Hatherton in Coorparoo.

She died in California on 28 April 1929. Her husband died in Toowoomba on 22 November 1940; he was cremated at Mount Thompson Crematorium and his ashes placed at the Central Technical College according to his wishes.

A biographical portrait of May Jordan McConnel appears in Heather Grant's 2005 book Great Queensland Women.

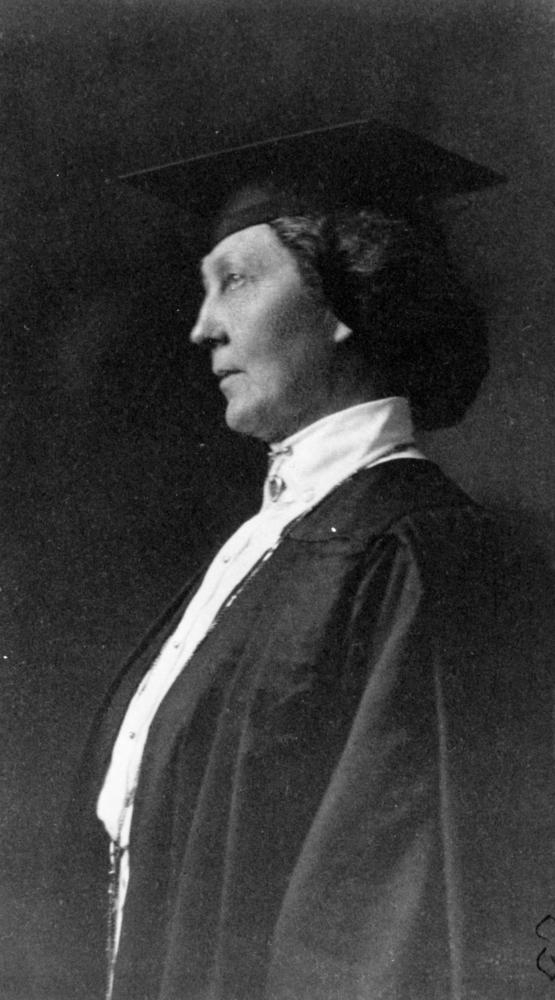
May Emma McConnel
