= Statue of Emma Miller =

Statue in Brisbane, Australia

Coordinates: 27°28′7.55″S 153°1′26.242″E

The Statue of Emma Miller is located in King George Square in Brisbane, Australia. It honours the life of Emma Miller, an English-born Australian pioneer trade union organiser and suffragist.

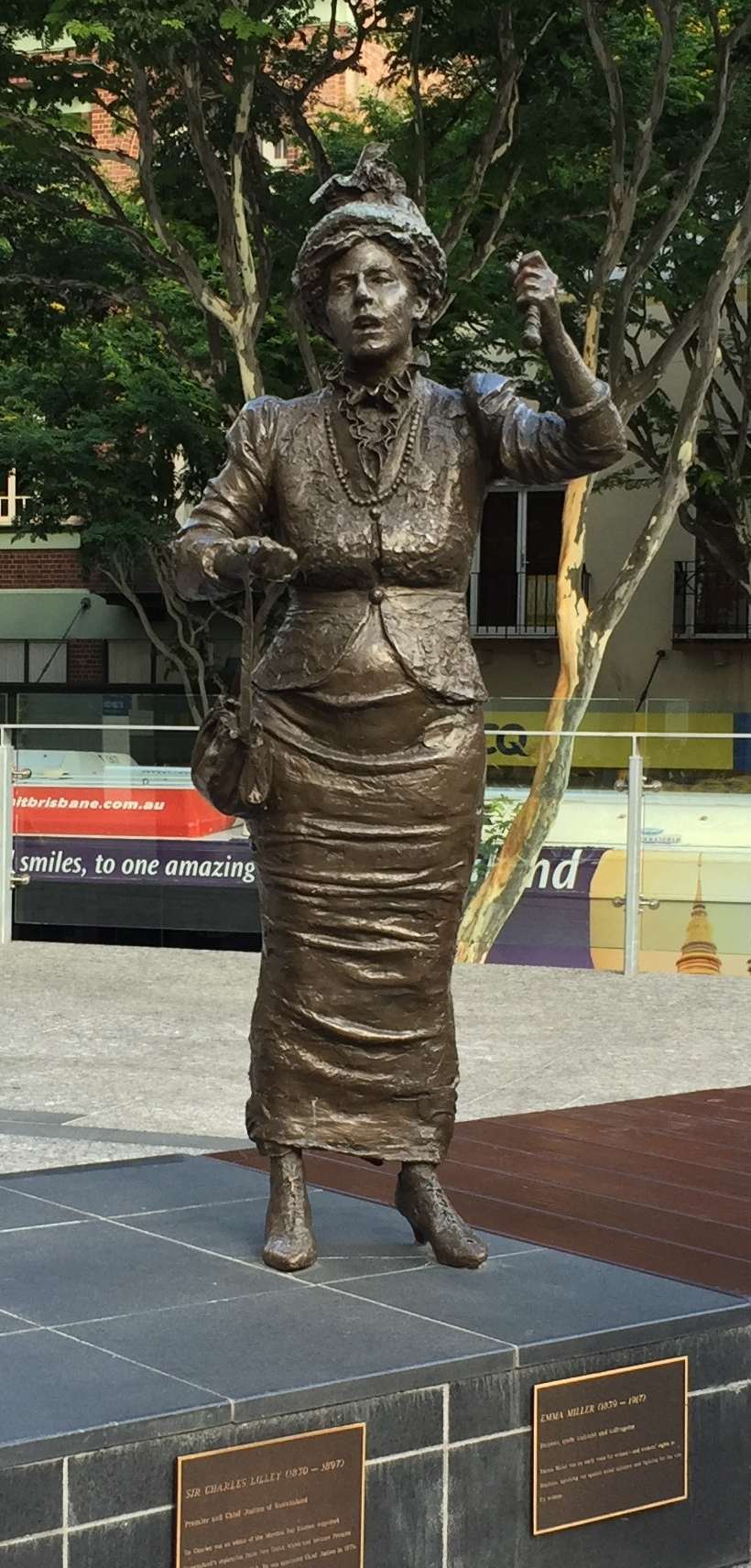
Statue of Emma Miller in 2015

The statue is made of bronze and was installed in 1993. It is placed between two other bronze statues of notable Queenslanders, Steele Rudd and Sir Charles Lilley. The part of the square where the three statues are located is known as Speaker's Corner.

The statue originally included an umbrella, held in Miller's left hand. It has been removed and there is a hand-scratched message on the base of the statue asking where it is.

== See also ==
- List of monuments and memorials to women's suffrage
