= Ada Buisson =

English author (1839–1866)

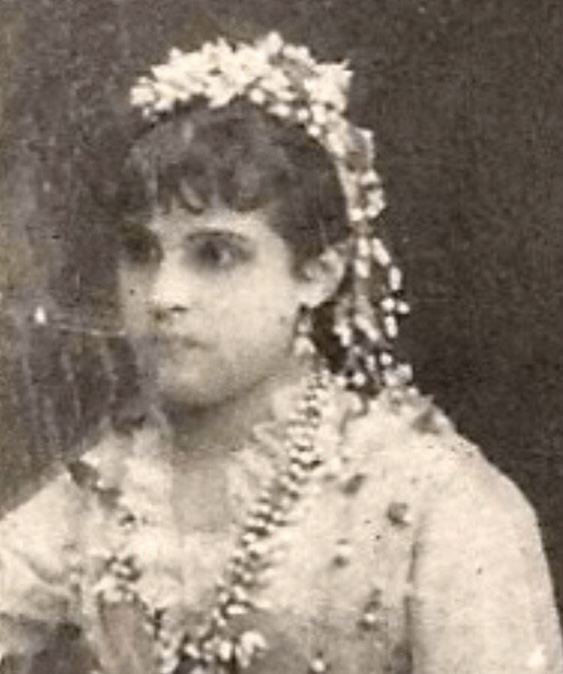
Ada Buisson, c. 1866

Ada Buisson (26 March 1839 – 27 December 1866) was an English novelist best remembered for her ghost stories.

== Biography ==
Ada Buisson was born in Battersea in Surrey, the third child of French-born merchant Jean François (aka 'John Francis') Buisson (1797–1871) and his English wife Dorothy Jane (née Smither; 1817–1852). Her eldest sibling was Leontine, who later became a teacher, writer and fine essayist, suffragist and campaigner for women's rights in Queensland, Australia. Her father was declared bankrupt in 1842, and in about 1850 she and her family moved to Brighton, where her mother died in 1852. From 1854 to 1855, along with her sisters Leontine and Irma, she studied moral philosophy and natural history at the women-only Bedford College in London.

Ada Buisson died in 1866 in Boulogne-sur-Mer, aged 27.

== Work ==
During her life, Buisson published one novel, Put to the Test (1865), published by John Maxwell. The remainder of her work, consisting of a second novel, A Terrible Wrong: A Novel (1867), published by T. C. Newby, and various short stories, were published shortly after her death. Various of her writings appeared in Belgravia, a magazine edited by her friend, the novelist Mary Elizabeth Braddon, whom she met through Braddon's husband, Buisson's publisher John Maxwell. In this were posthumously published her six ghost stories: "My Aunt's Pearl Ring" (1867), "A Story Told in a Church" (1867), "The Ghost's Summons" (1868), "The Baron's Coffin" (1869), and "My Sister Caroline" (1870). Buisson's writings were later mistakenly ascribed to Braddon by Montague Summers, a scholar of Gothic literature. Summers's mistake, published in The Times Literary Supplement on 30 September 1944, was corrected by Buisson's nephew Frederick Buisson Evans (1874-1952) three weeks later.

Buisson's tale "The Ghost's Summons", published posthumously in Belgravia (January 1868), has been anthologised in collections of ghost stories. A collection of five of her ghost stories, originally printed in Belgravia, was published in 2022 as The Baron's Coffin and Other Disquieting Tales.
