= Sylvia Pankhurst (artwork) =

Sculpture in Mile End Park, London, England

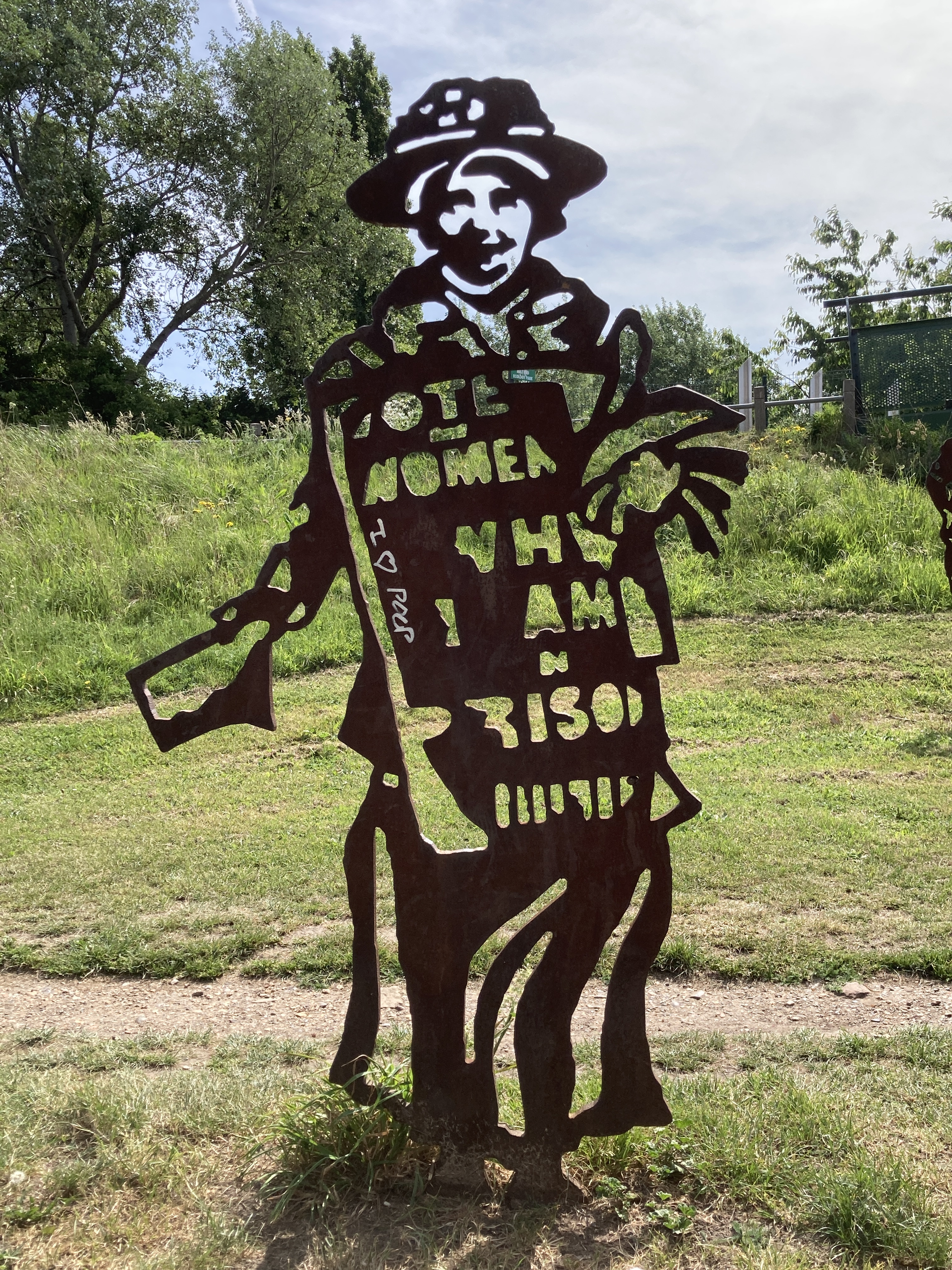
- Year: 2011
- Type: Corten steel
- Location: London, England; 51.528060°N 0.040234°W

A sculpture of Sylvia Pankhurst is located in Mile End Park, Bethnal Green, London, England. It honours the life of Sylvia Pankhurst, a leading English suffragette and socialist.

The statue is a two-dimensional silhouette constructed of Corten steel, which is designed to rust over time. It is one of three located in the park, which are together part of a national project by the charity Sustrans to beautify areas used by foot, public transport and cycle commuters. The three figures portrayed were selected by the local community for the contribution they made to local history or culture.

The artwork shows Pankhurst grasping a pile of papers in her left arm, and handing out papers with her right hand. It was unveiled on 15 August 2011.

== See also ==
- List of monuments and memorials to women's suffrage
