= Dorothy Tangney =

Australian politician (1907–1985)

Dame Dorothy Tangney DBE
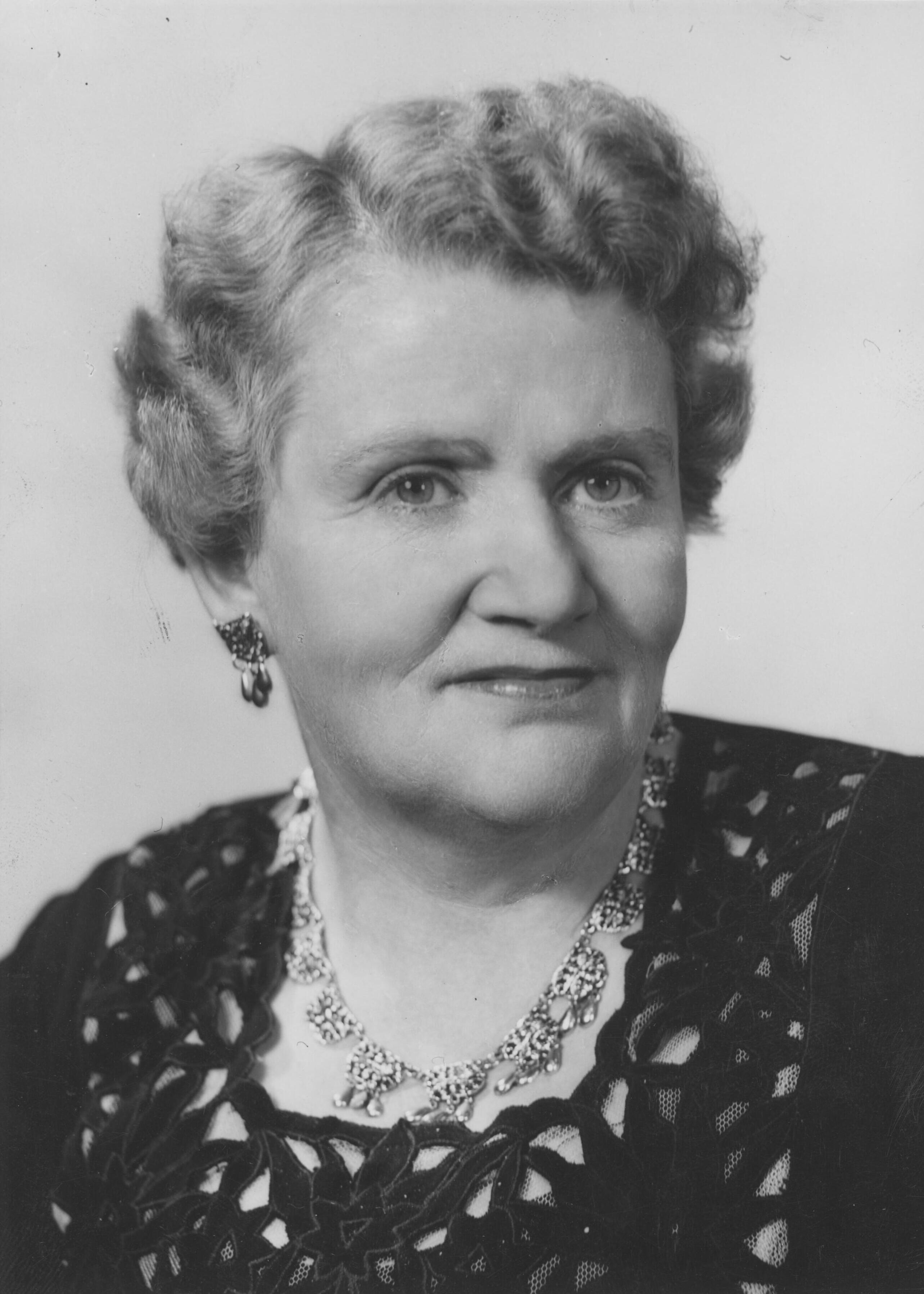

Senator for Western Australia
- In office 21 August 1943 – 30 June 1968

Personal details
- Born: 13 March 1907 North Perth, Western Australia
- Died: 3 June 1985 (aged 78) Wembley, Western Australia
- Party: Australian Labor Party
- Education: University of Western Australia
- Occupation: Teacher

Dame Dorothy Margaret Tangney DBE (13 March 1907 – 3 June 1985) was an Australian politician. She was a member of the Australian Labor Party (ALP) and served as a Senator for Western Australia from 1943 to 1968. She was the first woman elected to the Senate and one of the first two women elected to federal parliament, along with Enid Lyons.

Tangney was born in Perth to a working-class family of Irish descent. She spent her early years in country Western Australia and later in Fremantle. She trained as a schoolteacher and attended the University of Western Australia, where she was president of the University Labor Club. She was active in the Teachers' Union and community organisations. Tangney was elected to the Senate at the 1943 federal election, after several previous candidacies at state and federal level. She was re-elected on four further occasions before her defeat in 1967, serving nearly 25 years in the Senate. In the Senate, Tangney served on numerous committees and was particularly interested in education and social policy. She was her party's only female parliamentarian throughout her service.

== Early life ==
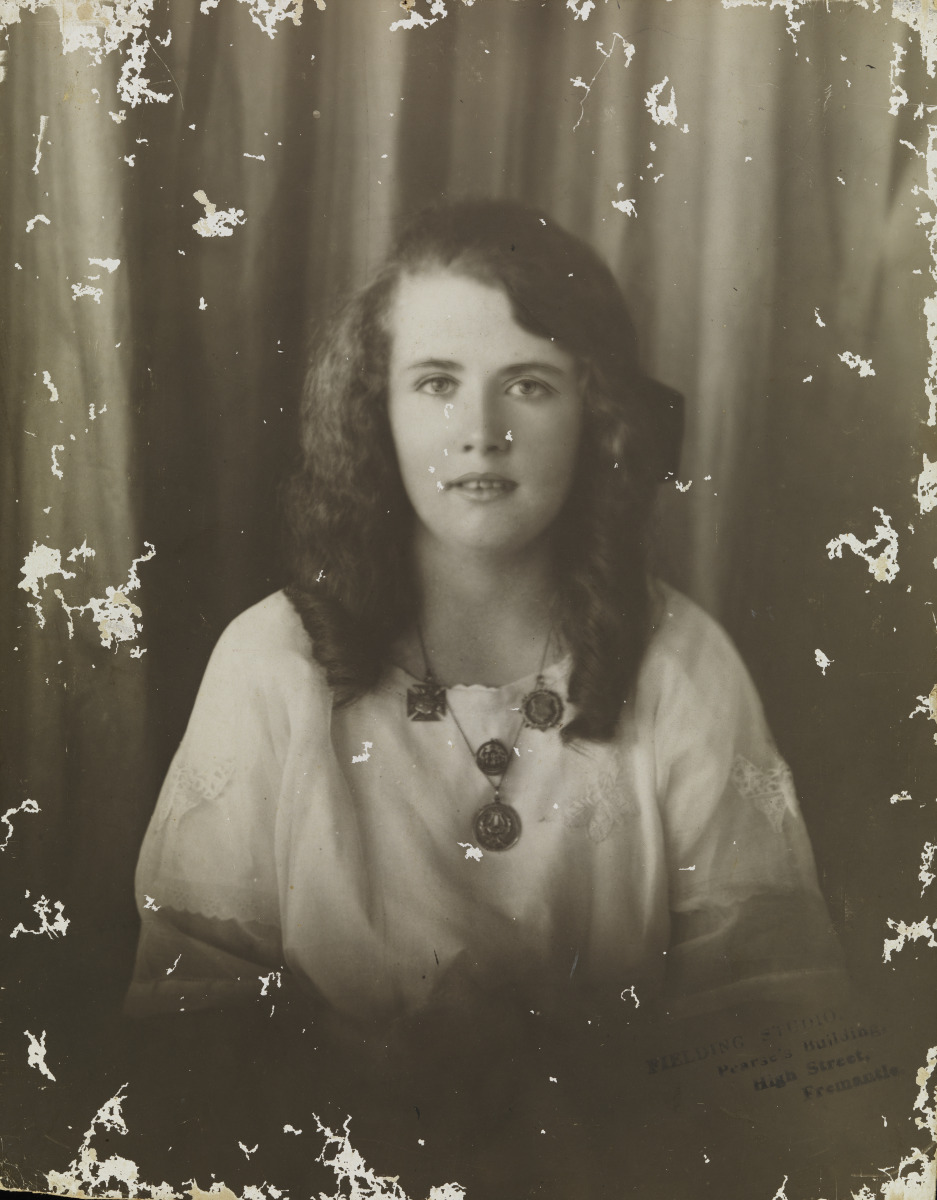
Tangney as a schoolgirl

Tangney was born on 13 March 1907 in North Perth, Western Australia. As an adult she claimed to have been born in 1911. She was the third of nine children born to Ellen (née Shanahan) and Eugene Tangney; her father was born in Ireland and her mother was of Irish descent. Her paternal grandfather Owen Shanahan assisted in Irish republican John Boyle O'Reilly's escape from Western Australia.

Tangney spent her early years in country Western Australia where her father was a locomotive driver and timber worker. The family lived in the Murchison for a period and later in Holyoake and Marrinup. When she was eight, her father found work in the port city of Fremantle where she attended St Joseph's Convent School. She won a scholarship to attend St Joseph's College, selling raffle tickets to raise money for her school uniform. Tangney passed her leaving certificate at the age of 15 and began training as a schoolteacher, combining her teaching work with part-time study at the University of Western Australia. She graduated with a Bachelor of Arts degree in 1927 and later completed a postgraduate diploma in education in 1932.

After several years in Fremantle, Tangney began teaching at Claremont Central School in 1929. She was involved in the Teachers' Union and a vice-president of the state Parents' and Citizens' Association. She attended the organisation's federal conference in Sydney in 1933 and was a delegate to the Pan-Pacific Conference in Wellington, New Zealand, in 1939.

== Early political involvement ==
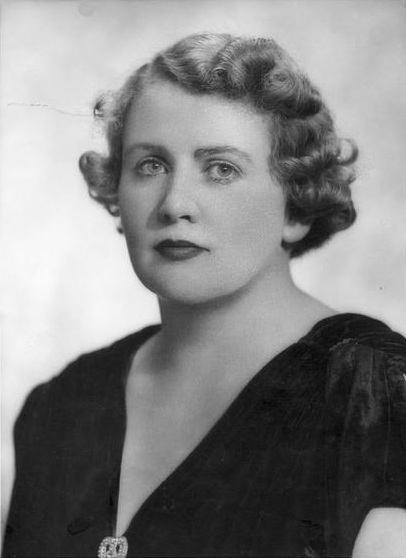
Tangney around the time of her election to the Senate

Tangney and her mother were active members of the Claremont branch of the Australian Labor Party (ALP). She was eventually elected to the Western Australian Labor Women's Organisation Committee, and then to the party's state executive. She helped establish the University Labor Club, later serving as its president, and was also the founding president of the Fremantle Young People's Ideal Club in 1929, which organised activities for the children of the unemployed and was absorbed into the Western Australian Young Labor League.

Tangney stood for the seat of Nedlands at the 1936 and 1939 Western Australian state elections, losing to her Nationalist opponent Norbert Keenan on both occasions. She won preselection for the ALP Senate ticket at the 1940 federal election, but was not elected.

== Senate ==
Tangney was elected to the Senate at the 1943 federal election to fill a casual vacancy originally caused by the death of Country Party senator Bertie Johnston; she succeeded Charles Latham who had filled the vacancy on an interim basis. She was the first woman elected to the Senate, with her term beginning immediately upon her election; Enid Lyons simultaneously became the first woman elected to the House of Representatives. Tangney was sworn in six minutes before Lyons.

Tangney was re-elected at the 1946, 1951, 1955 and 1961 federal elections, on each occasion being placed first on the ALP's ticket in Western Australia. She was defeated at the 1967 election after being relegated to third place on the ticket. Her final term ended on 30 June 1968, after just under 25 years in the Senate. During this time she was the ALP's only female parliamentarian. Tangney's period of service was a record for parliamentary service by a woman until surpassed by Kathy Sullivan in 1999 and a record for female senators until surpassed by Marise Payne in 2022. She was also the first woman to preside over the Senate, serving as a temporary chairman of committees in the early 1960s.

=== Political positions ===
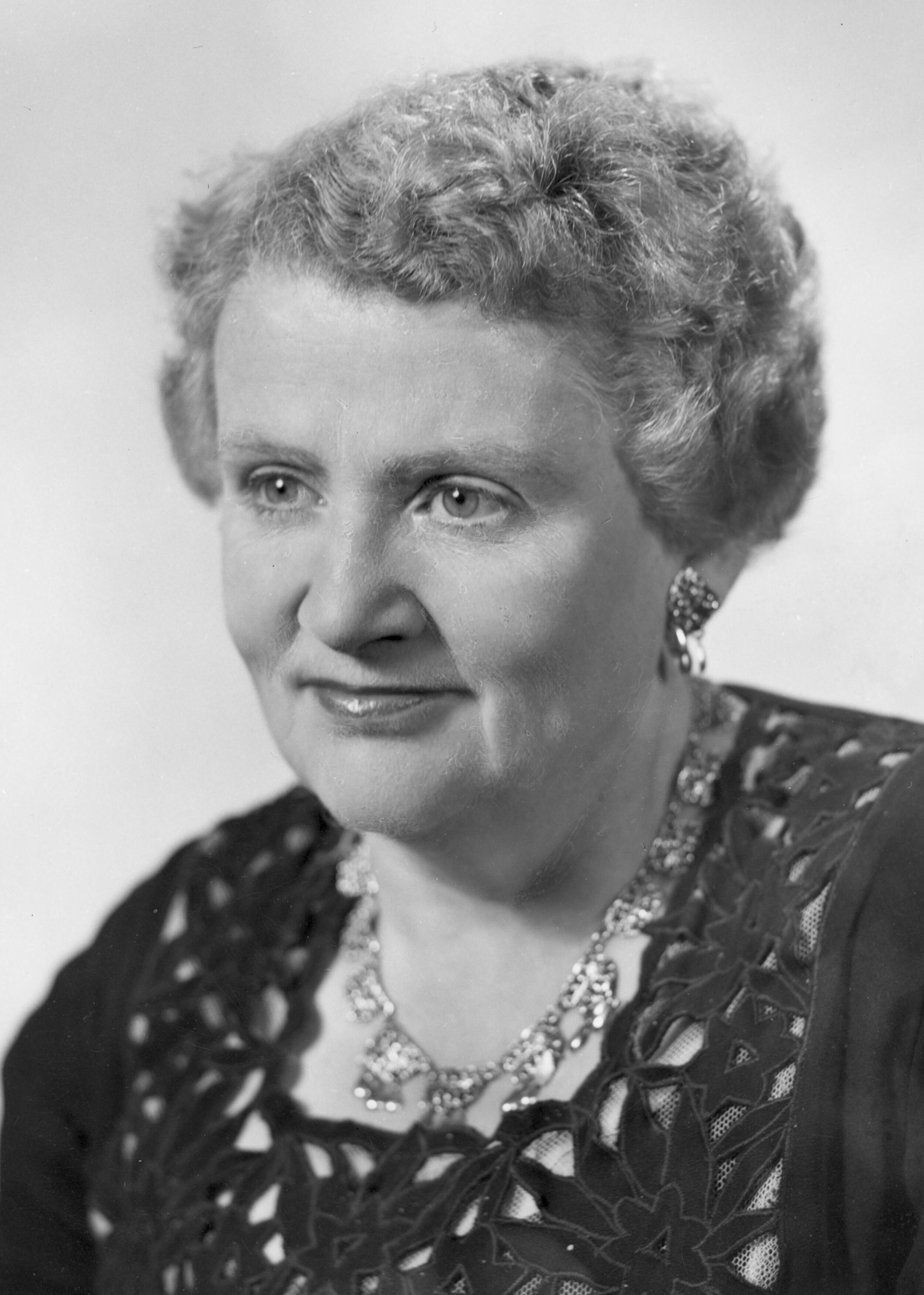
Tangney later in her career

In the Senate, Tangney "actively promoted the needs and interests of women, and provided vital conduits for women who approached them, either singly or in organised groups, to raise their concerns". She supported increased federal involvement in social services, including the expansion of child endowment, pensions for widow's and deserted wives, increased public housing and the introduction of a national health system with medical and hospital benefits. Tangney also took a keen interest in education, calling on greater federal support of universities. She supported the establishment of the Australian National University (ANU) and in 1951 was appointed to the inaugural ANU Council, serving until 1968.

In 1954, Tangney was elected to the ALP's parliamentary executive with the support of the left faction, although some of her views were considered right-wing. She was an anti-communist and opposed Jessie Street's Women's Charter movement, describing it as "Communist-inspired". According to her biographer Carmen Lawrence, she "projected a fairly conventional view of womanhood" and did not describe herself as a feminist. Despite her anti-communism, Tangney opposed Australia's involvement in the Vietnam War, particularly the use of national servicemen, citing the experiences of her family in earlier wars. She lobbied for the construction of a naval base in Cockburn Sound, which was eventually built as HMAS Stirling.

== Later life ==
In 1968, despite the ALP's objection to imperial honours, Tangney became the first woman born in Western Australia to be appointed a Dame Commander of the Order of the British Empire (DBE). Her award was for her services to the Australian Parliament. In retirement Tangney remained active in community causes and lived at her home in Claremont until 1978, when she moved to a nursing home. She died in Wembley on 3 June 1985, aged 78, and was buried in the Catholic section of Karrakatta Cemetery.

== Legacies ==
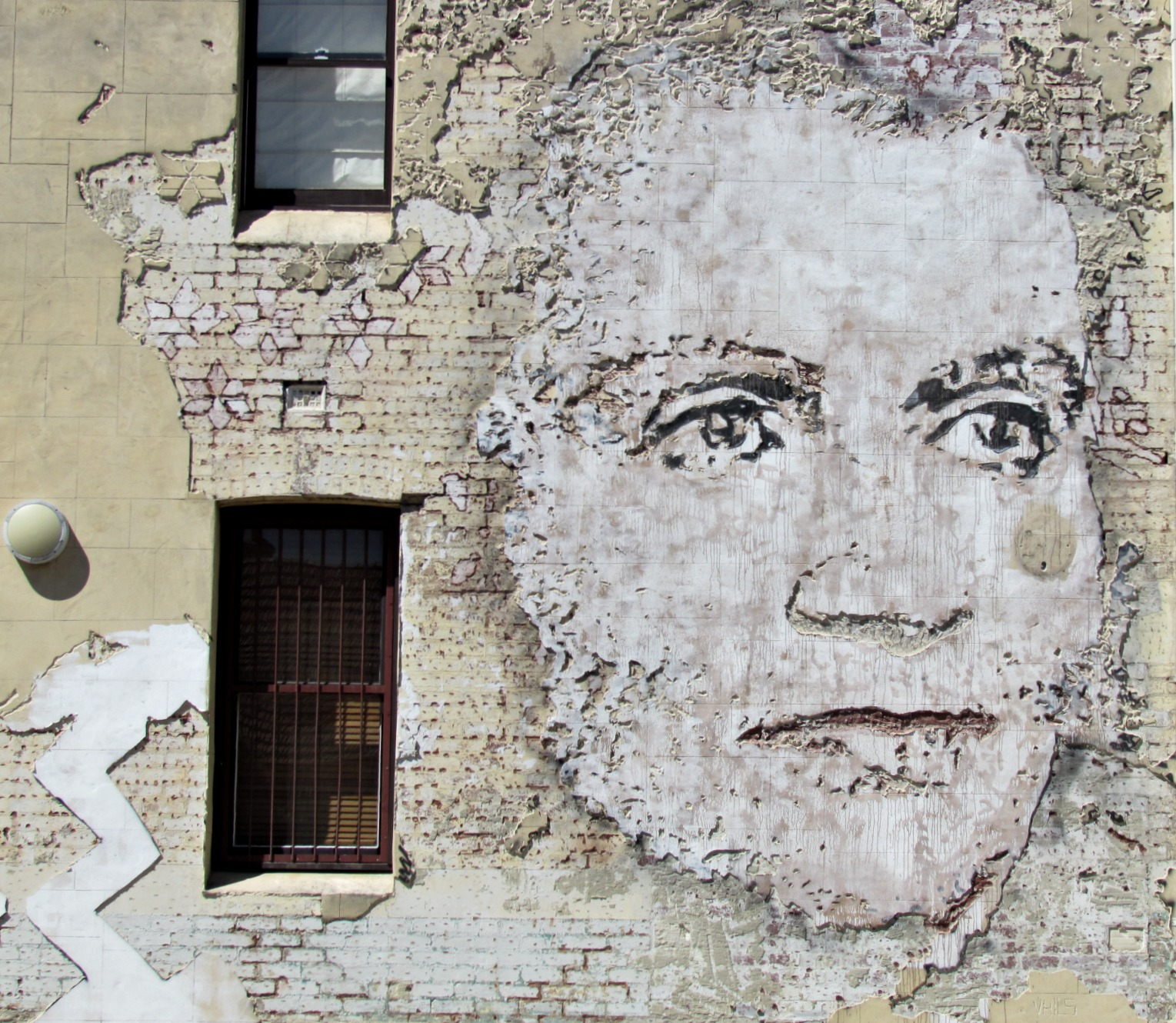
2013 sculpture of Tangney on the wall of the Norfolk Hotel, Fremantle

- In 1974 the federal electoral division of Tangney in Western Australia was named in her honour.
- In 1999 a street in Canberra, formerly known as Administration Place, was changed to Dorothy Tangney Place.
- In 1993 she and Dame Enid Lyons, the first female member of the Australian House of Representatives, appeared on an Australia Post postage stamp.
- In 2001 she was inducted into the Victorian Honour Roll of Women.
- In 2013 the Norfolk Hotel in Fremantle, Western Australia was decorated with a wall sculpture of Tangney. It was carved by the Portuguese artist VHILS (aka Alexander Farto) and his assistants.
- In 2019, a street in the newly constructed Kambri precinct on the campus of the Australian National University in Canberra was named Tangney Road.
- In March 2023, a dual bronze sculpture of Tangney and Dame Enid Lyons was placed in the gardens of Old Parliament House, Canberra. The statues, sculpted by Lis Johnson, were inspired by an iconic photograph of the pair entering the building on their first day of parliament in September 1943.

== See also ==
- List of the first women holders of political offices in Oceania

== Sources ==
- Senate Brief No 3, Women in the Senate, Parliament of Australia, Department of the Senate. 1999
