= Lizzie Rattray =

NZ journalist, suffragist, welfare worker

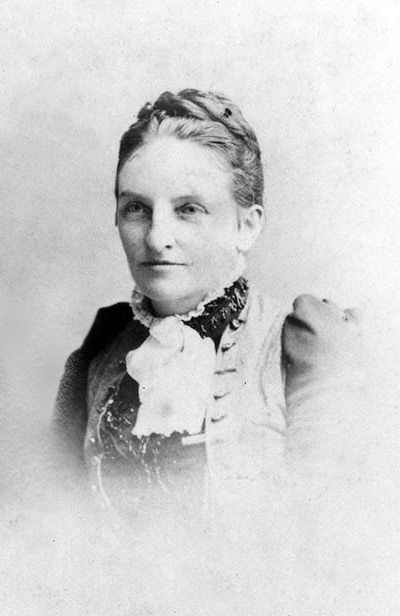
- Born: Lizzie Frost Fenton; 22 March 1855; Dunedin, New Zealand
- Died: 12 August 1931 (aged 76); Parnell, New Zealand
- Spouse: William Rattray

Lizzie Frost Rattray (née Fenton, 22 March 1855 – 12 August 1931) was a New Zealand journalist, suffragist and welfare worker.

== Early life ==
Rattray was born on 22 March 1855 in Dunedin, Otago, New Zealand to Mary Lister and Archdeacon John Albert Fenton. Her family returned to Europe for the children's education, and she was brought up in England and France.

== Career ==
After their return to New Zealand in 1880, Lizzie Fenton became director of the Young Women's Institute, a forerunner of the Young Women's Christian Association. In 1883 she married William Rattray, a prosperous Auckland draper. After initial interest in charity work for the St John Ambulance, Lizzie moved on to suffrage and other feminist causes, using her position as a journalist to get her message heard. Writing for the Gentlewoman and the New Zealand Graphic she wrote about employment, education and the franchise. She was elected to the Women's Franchise League and instrumental in opening membership to men.

Rattray published under the name Mrs. W. Rattray in the New Zealand Family Friend and The Observer. From 17 to 31 August 1889, the story "Evelyn Mossley's Lover: A Sketch" appeared in three installments in the Waikato Times, and from 28 December 1889 to 5 April 1890, the story "Bristondell, or an Unlucky Marriage". Another story, "Camella, or An Ignorant Wrangler", ran from 20 January to 2 June 1891. From 1892 to 1893, her serial "Ruha: A Tale of Adventure in the Maori War" was published in Cassell's Magazine. Because of these extensive publications, she was noticed New Zealand Graphic and became their "lady editor." She later won second prize in a Cassell's Magazine short story competition.

== Death ==
Rattray died on 12 August 1931 in Parnell, New Zealand.

Rattray appeared in the 1993 New Lynn Suffrage Memorial Mural.
