= Khartoum Place =

City square in Auckland, New Zealand

Coordinates: 36°51′03″S 174°45′57″E

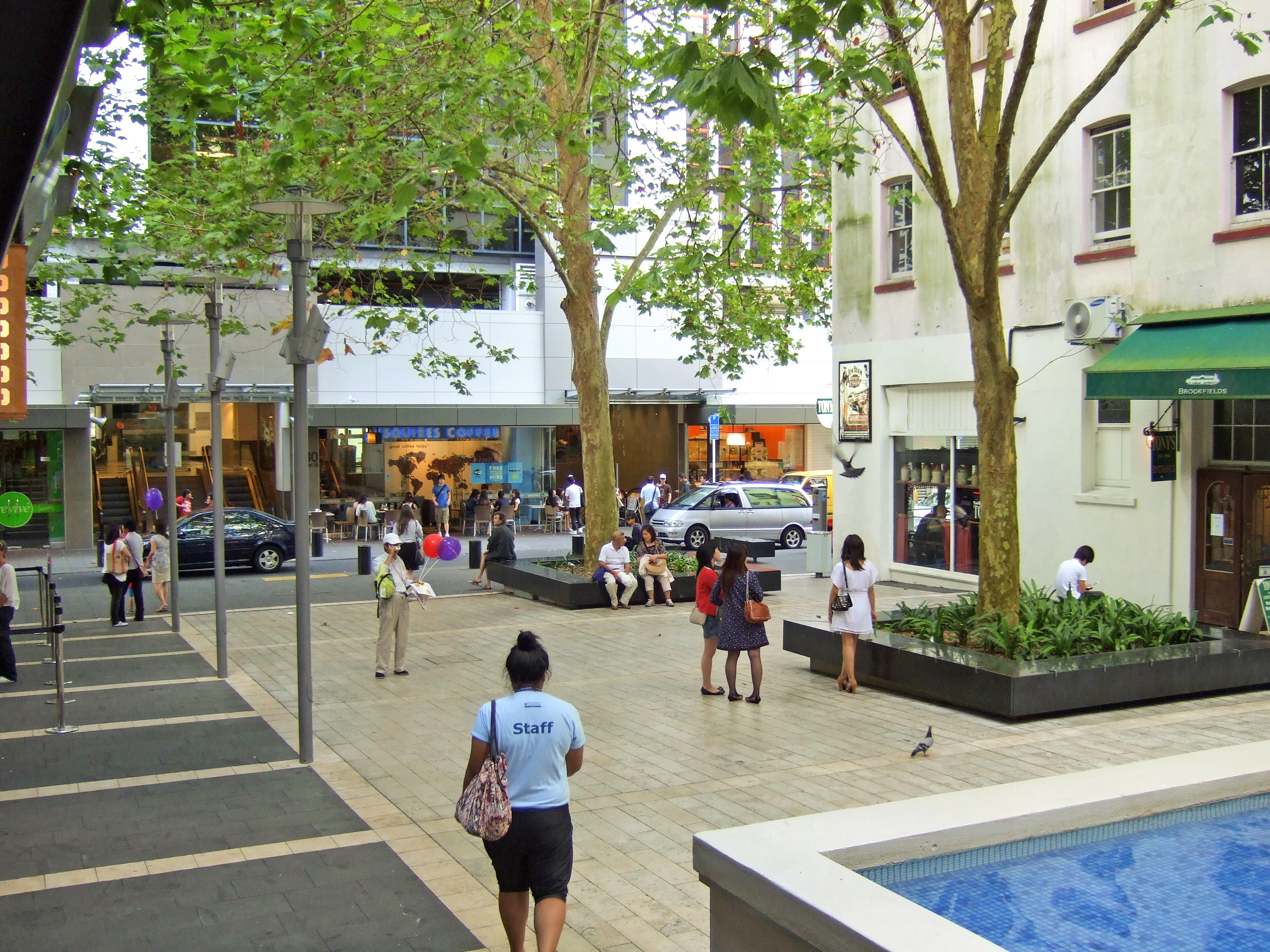
Lower Khartoum Place looking towards Lorne Street

Khartoum Place is a pedestrianised city square in the Auckland CBD, New Zealand. The square, protected by several mature trees, is located between Lorne Street and Kitchener Street, and provides a stairway connection between the two street levels.

The Auckland Art Gallery is located at the Kitchener Street end of the square, with other related exhibition and public space also arrayed around the square.

In 2006/2007, $2.2 million were spent on upgrading the lower part of the square, with Council intending to spend another $1 million in 2011 to complete the upgrade on the upper level.

The land where Khartoum Place is located was once under the control of iwi such as Te Waiōhua and Ngāti Whātua. Ngāti Whātua transferred land, including Khartoum Place, to the Crown in 1840. The first recorded name of the site, Coburg Place, was changed to Kitchener Place during World War I to commemorated the death of Horatio Herbert Kitchener who died in 1916. In 1939, the name was changed to Khartoum Place, still referencing Kitchener who was the 1st Earl Kitchener of Khartoum. Lower Khartoum Place was renamed Te Hā o Hine Suffrage Place in July 2016 following a decision by the Waitematā Local Board. Te Hā o Hine comes from the whakataukī (Māori proverb) Me aro koe ki te hā o Hine ahu one, which can be interpreted as 'pay heed to the dignity of women'.

== Auckland Women's Suffrage Memorial ==
The Auckland Women's Suffrage Memorial is located at Te Hā o Hine Place, previously known as Lower Khartoum Place. The mural was designed by Jan Morrison and Claudia Pond Eyley in 1993, celebrating the centenary of women's suffrage in New Zealand. It is classed as a category 1 historic place by Heritage New Zealand.
