= Leontine Cooper =

Australian teacher and union organiser (1837–1903)

- Born: Leontine Mary Jane Buisson; 22 April 1837; England
- Died: 12 March 1903 (aged 65); Queensland, Australia
- Spouse: Edward Cooper (m. 1866)

Leontine Cooper (22 April 1837 – 12 March 1903) was a teacher, trade union organiser, suffragist and campaigner for women's rights in Queensland, Australia.

== Life ==
Leontine Mary Jane Buisson was born 22 April 1837 in Battersea, Surrey to Frenchman Jean François (aka 'John Francis') Buisson and his English wife, Dorothy.

Leontine was the eldest of their children and she grew up first in Battersea then in Brighton. A younger sister was the author Ada Buisson (1839–1866).

She married Edward Cooper on 31 January 1866 in Hampstead, north London and they emigrated to Australia about 1871. Leontine was employed as a teacher soon after her arrival in Queensland, working first at the Albany Creek School, then as the French teacher at Brisbane Girls Grammar School.

She was also a writer, with her short stories appearing in The Boomerang and in the mid-1890s she combined two of her interests, as she edited Queensland's only women's suffrage newspaper, The Star. Leontine was very well educated and was published several times on the 'letters to the editor' page of newspapers, having commented on issues of the day.

From 1894, she was president of the Women's Franchise League in Queensland.

Leontine died on 12 March 1903 from pneumonia, two years before Queensland women gained the vote.
