= Journal of Green Building =

Quarterly academic journal

The Journal of Green Building is a quarterly peer-reviewed academic journal covering research on green buildings, applications, techniques, and processes. It was established in 2006 and the editor-in-chief is Steffen Lehmann (University of South Australia). The journal is abstracted and indexed in the Arts & Humanities Citation Index and Current Contents/Arts & Humanities.
