= Women's Equal Franchise Association =

The Women's Equal Franchise Association (1894–1905) was a women's suffrage organisation in Queensland, Australia. The association was founded in March 1894 at a meeting in the Brisbane Town Hall with approximately 110 members. Mrs John Donaldson was the founding president and Charlotte Eleanor Trundle was the secretary. The initial aim of the association was to secure the right to vote for every adult woman.

At the second general meeting of the association on 27 April 1894, Emma Miller was elected president and the wording of a petition to be presented to the Queensland Parliament was agreed. Unlike the original aim of the association, the petition called for "granting to white women the franchise, embodying the principle of one adult one vote and one only", rejecting the system of plural voting then used for men. By rejecting plural voting, the association was strongly aligning itself with the labour movement in Queensland which supported the principle of "one man, one vote".

After the Federation of Australia, the Commonwealth Franchise Act 1902 gave white women the right to vote in federal elections and the right to stand for election to the Australian Parliament. It was not until 1905 that the Queensland Parliament passed the Elections Act Amendment Act to allow women to vote (but not stand) in Queensland state elections.

On 4 May 1905, the Women's Equal Franchise Association held a social event at the Brisbane Trades Hall to celebrate obtaining the franchise for women in Queensland and disbanded the organisation.

== Postscript ==
The 1907 state election, held on 18 May 1907, was the first Queensland state election at which women were entitled to vote. In 1915, women were allowed to stand for election to the Queensland Parliament. The suffrage law extension of 1905 did not extend to Indigenous citizens of the state, male and female, who did not gain the vote until 1962.
