= Australian Federation of Employers and Industries =

Employers organization in Australia

The Australian Federation of Employers and Industries (AFEI) is an independent peak employers group - one of the oldest business advisory organisations in Australia. AFEI has been a major party in running almost every major test case in the NSW industrial jurisdiction. AFEI is a major contributor to the formulation of employer policy and is actively involved in all major workplace relations issues affecting Australian businesses.

== History ==
AFEI was founded in 1903 as the Employers' Federation of NSW. It later became a national organisation and was renamed Employers First, changing to the Australian Federation of Employers and Industries in 2008. AFEI is a not-for-profit organisation with over 3,500 members and more than 60 affiliated industry associations. Its main role is to advise, represent and assist employers in meeting their obligations relating to workplace relations, to assist them with human resources management, to provide OHS and other relevant training and, importantly, to seek appropriate regulation from government. Membership extends across employers of all sizes and a wide diversity of industries. Garry Brack is CEO of AFEI.

== Publications ==
- 2008 Submission to the Productivity Commission's Inquiry into paid maternity, paternity and parental leave.
- 2008 Minimum Wage Review and NSW State Wage Case
- 2006 Submission to the Stein Inquiry into the NSW Occupational Health and Safety legislation
- 2005 Submission to the Review of the Occupation Health and Safety Act.
- AFEI monthly newsletter, the Adviser, discussing news and developments in workplace legislation and case law.

== See also ==
- Economy of Australia
