= New Lynn Suffrage Memorial Mural =

Public artwork in Auckland

The New Lynn Suffrage Memorial Mural is a public artwork located at the New Lynn Community Centre in New Lynn, Auckland, New Zealand.

The original mural was painted by Sally Griffin in 1993 for the centenary of women's suffrage in New Zealand. It was 4.8 metres long and featured eight panels, and was financed by Portage Licensing Trust. In 1999 the community centre was demolished and the mural was lost.

In 2012 a replacement mural was unveiled. It is painted in a modernist style and features suffragists Amey Daldy, Dolce Cabot, Lady Anna Stout, Harriet Morrison, Jessie Mackay, Learmonth Dalrymple, Meri Maungakāhia and Kate Sheppard.

== See also ==
- List of monuments and memorials to women's suffrage
- Women's suffrage in New Zealand
