= Centenary of Women's Suffrage Commemorative Fountain =

Fountain in Canberra, Australia

- Year: 2003
- Location: Canberra, Australian Capital Territory, Australia; 35°18′11″S 149°07′50″E

The Centenary of Women's Suffrage Fountain is located in the grounds of Old Parliament House in Canberra, Australian Capital Territory, Australia. It commemorates the passing of the Commonwealth Franchise Act 1902, which granted the right to vote to white Australian women over 21 years of age.

In 2002, Senator Amanda Vanstone launched a design competition for a memorial to mark the centenary of women's suffrage in Australia. The winning design was an 18-metre tall red steel structure, in a fan design with 10 rotating blades. It had been designed by Sydney artists Jennifer Turpin and Michaelie Crawford. The artwork was to be placed prominently behind the Old Parliament House building. However, due to delays with the completion of the artwork, Vanstone's office announced in September 2003 that the contract with the artists was cancelled. Simultaneously, there was considerable public and media controversy occurring over the appropriacy of the design and its placement in such a significant location.

In 2003 the Minister for the Status of Women, Senator Kay Patterson, proposed a fountain as a memorial structure. Cate Riley and Andrew Smith of the National Capital Authority worked on the design of the memorial and artist Mary Stuart created and placed the mosaic tiles.

The fountain is a rectangular shape, with six jets on either side, and a weir at one end. The border of the pool carries text commemorating the passage of the Commonwealth Franchise Act, and of the election of the following year – the first election in which women were able to stand for office, and to vote.

A walkway leading away from the fountain is embedded with tiles describing achievements of women in the Federal Parliament of Australia.

== See also ==
- List of monuments and memorials to women's suffrage
