= Barbara Haney Irvine =

American historic preservationist

- Born: 1944 (age 81–82); United States
- Occupation: Historic preservationist
- Known for: Women's historic sites preservationist

Barbara Haney Irvine (born 1944) is an American advocate for the preservation of women's historic sites. Irvine is the founding president of the Alice Paul Institute, named after American suffragist leader Alice Paul, and was the executive director of the New Jersey Historic Trust. In 2007 she was an honoree for Women's History Month by the National Women's History Project.

== Historic preservation ==
"While Barbara Haney Irvine was initially influenced by Alice Paul, she has created her own powerful legacy through her tireless efforts to ensure that the stories of women’s lives and the places where women lived, worked and died will continue to inspire us and all future generations. - The National Women's History Project

=== Alice Paul Institute and Paulsdale ===
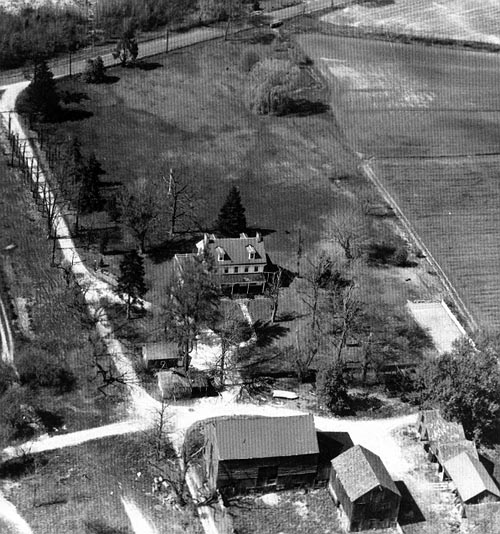
Paulsdale, ca. 1958, the birthplace and childhood home of Alice Paul

Finding inspiration in the life of Alice Paul, the suffragist and women's rights activist who initiated and ran the main actions and events of the 1910s Women's Voting Rights Movement which successfully lobbied for the 19th amendment winning women the right to vote, Irvine co-founded the Alice Paul Centennial Foundation in 1984 to celebrate the centennial of Paul's birth. Later, APCF became the Alice Paul Institute. In 2024, on the occasion of its 40th anniversary, API became the Alice Paul Center for Gender Justice.

For over 16 years Irvine served as volunteer president and board chair for API, leading successful campaigns to preserve historic objects related to Paul's life. The group successfully raised over $58,000 to purchase a collection of Paul's books, papers and personal items, including a desk owned by Susan B. Anthony which Paul also used during her movement. The collection was then donated to the National Museum of American History in Washington, D.C., and the Schlesinger Library on the History of Women in America at Harvard University.

Less than a year after the collection acquisition, API was offered the chance to purchase Paulsdale, the birthplace and childhood home of Alice Paul, in Mount Laurel, New Jersey. The home was surrounded by a housing development, which threatened to swallow the six-acre site. Irvine led the national campaign to preserve the site, raising over $1.8 million in private and public funds to purchase and rehabilitate the site, turning it into a leadership center for girls and young women. In 1991, under the leadership of Irvine, the property was declared a National Historic Landmark. Paulsdale continues to serve as a leadership development center for women and girls attesting to the ongoing inspiration of Paul's vision for women's equality. The Barbara Haney Irvine Library at Paulsdale honors its founding director.

=== Other opportunities in heritage preservation ===
During the Paulsdale campaign, Irvine started and chaired the first national conference on women's historic sites. This conference was held in 1994 at Bryn Mawr College, and in 1999 the National Collaborative for Women's History Sites was founded. The Collaborative serves to preserve and interpret the sites and venues where women were key in American history. During this time, Irvine also assisted in the creation of the New Jersey Women's Heritage Trail. Irvine has also served as a program content adviser for the New Jersey history program, Our Vanishing Past, produced by the New Jersey Network.

== Current life ==
In 2004 Irvine became the executive director of the New Jersey Historic Trust, seeking to shift the Trusts' focus towards the preservation of urban historic buildings. She retired in 2007. She is married to Geoffrey Irvine and now, returning to her home state, lives in Pittsboro, NC.

== Awards ==
In 2000 Irvine was appointed to the Women's Progress Commemorative Commission, and in 2005 she was named "Woman of the Year" by Gamma Sigma Sigma. In 2007 she was an honoree for Women's History Month, sponsored by the National Women's History Project.

== See also ==
- John T. Cunningham
- J. Owen Grundy
