= John T. Cunningham =

American journalist

- Born: 26 June 1915; Newark, New Jersey
- Died: 7 June 2012 (aged 96); Morristown, New Jersey
- Education: Morristown High School; Drew University
- Occupations: Journalist, writer, historian
- Spouse: Dorothy Behre (1916-1995)

John T. Cunningham (June 26, 1915 – June 7, 2012) was an American journalist, writer, and historian who published numerous works related to the history of his native state, New Jersey. Long known as "New Jersey’s popular historian", his This is New Jersey, originally published in 1953, has never gone out of print. Cunningham work has also included collaboration on several documentaries and frequent speaking engagements.

== Early life and career ==
Cunningham was born in Newark, New Jersey on June 26, 1915, one of eight children of Guy Cunningham and Margaret Morrissey. He was raised in the Brookside section of Mendham Township, New Jersey near Morristown, where he graduated from Morristown High School in 1932, and later able to pay tuition, he graduated from Drew University in 1938. He worked briefly for the Morristown Record, to which he had been contributing local interest articles since high school, and in 1939 was hired by the Newark News. During World War II, became a captain in the Army Air Corps. He returned to The News in 1946 and stayed until 1963, when he began writing and publishing full-time.

== Later career ==
Cunningham began his writing about history while working at the Newark News, where, around 1947, he was assigned a column called "Let's Explore." He said,"My goals did not include either the writing of books or becoming a historian," but he became well respected as a historian and writer.

"I doubt if there is a community in this state that I couldn't tell you about," he declared."I consider myself a journalist rather than a historian. A journalist lets it fall where it should. We approach things with an open mind, while historians tend to take a subject and find the material to prove their point."

The New York Times said that while Cunningham's books are not considered academic works since illustrations are common and footnotes are rare, they are concise, energetic and well regarded among their genre.

In the 1970s, he and his wife founded Afton Publishing, and he helped establish the New Jersey Historical Commission. He lived in Florham Park, New Jersey, where he continued his work. Cunningham died on June 7, 2012, from natural causes at a Morristown Medical Center.

== Selected works (to 1997) ==
=== Histories ===
- Baseball In New Jersey: The Game of History (New Jersey State Museum, 1995)
- Beginnings (Atlantic City Electric Company History, 1962)
- Capsules of New Jersey History (New Jersey Manufacturers Association, 1981)
- A Century of Progress a history of Passaic County (First National Bank of Passaic County, 1965)
- Chatham: At the Crossing of the Fishawack (Chatham Historical Society, 1966)
- Chatham (1997) and Madison (1998), Images of America Series (Arcadia Publishing)
- Clara Maas: A Nurse, a Hospital, a Spirit (Clara Maas Memorial Hospital, 1968)
- Colonial New Jersey (Thomas Nelson, 1964)
- Garden State: The Story of Agriculture in New Jersey (Rutgers University Press, 1955)
- The East of Jersey (New Jersey Historical Society, 1988)
- Made in New Jersey (Rutgers University Press, 1954)
- Newark (New Jersey Historical Society, 1966)
- New Jersey, America's Main Road (Doubleday, 1966)
- On the Right Track, a history of the Madison Y.M.C.A. (Madison Y.M.C.A., 1990)
- The New Jersey Sampler: Historic Tales of Old New Jersey (Afton Publishing, 1964)
- New Jersey's Five Who Signed, on the Declaration of Independence (New Jersey Historical Commission, 1975)
- New Jersey's Rich Harvest: A Brief History Agriculture in New Jersey (New Jersey Agricultural Society, 1981)
- The New Jersey Shore (Rutgers University Press, 1958)
- Railroading in New Jersey (Associated Railroads of New Jersey, 1952)
- Railroads in New Jersey: The Formative Years (Afton Publishing, 1997)
- Remembering Essex, with Charles Cummings, (Donning Company, 1995)
- This Is New Jersey (Rutgers University Press, 1953)
- Thomas Edison: They Called Him Wizard (Public Service Electric and Gas Company, 1979)
- University in the Forest: The Story of Drew University (Afton Publishing, 1972)

=== Textbooks ===
- New Jersey: A Mirror on America, for high school (Afton Publishing, updated by Patricia J. Cunningham, 2006)
- On the Go in New Jersey, elementary, (Afton Publishing, updated by Patricia J. Cunningham, 2008)
- On the Go in New York, elementary, (1990)
- On the Go in Pennsylvania, elementary, (1991)
- You, New Jersey And the World, elementary, digital (Afton Publishing, updated by Patricia J. Cunningham, 2012)

=== Photo essays ===
These works were created in collaboration with Walter Choroszewski:

- The Garden State in Bloom (Esthetic Press, 1993)
- New Jersey: A Scenic Discovery (Foremost Publishers, 1981)
- New Jersey: A Photographic Journey (Esthetic Press, 1987)
- New Jersey: Naturescapes and Detail (Esthetic Press, 1992)
- New Jersey: A Photographic Celebration (Esthetic Press, 1994)

=== Documentaries ===
- New Jersey Legacy series

== See also ==
- Henry Charlton Beck
- Daniel Denton
- Henry Howe
- J. Owen Grundy
- Barbara Haney Irvine
- John P. Snyder
