= Paulsdale =

Birthplace and childhood home of suffragist Alice Paul

- Alice Paul Birthplace
- U.S. National Register of Historic Places
- U.S. National Historic Landmark
- New Jersey Register of Historic Places
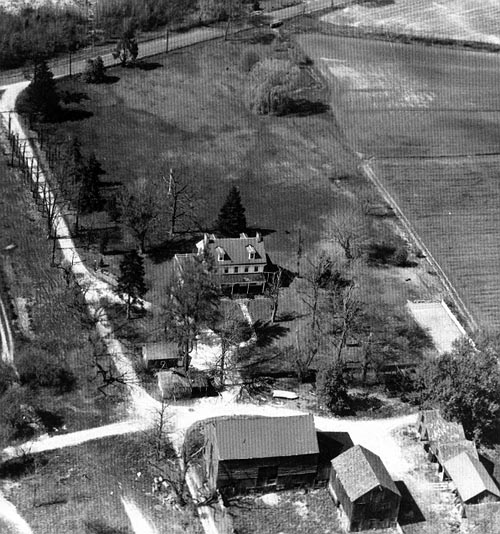
- Paulsdale, c. 1958, with Hooton Road in the background

- Location within Burlington County, New Jersey Location within New Jersey Location within the United States
- Location: 128 Hooton Road; Mount Laurel Township, New Jersey 08054
- Coordinates: 39°57′24″N 74°55′50.5″W
- Area: 6.5 acres (2.6 ha)
- Built: 1840
- Built by: Benjamin Hooton
- NRHP reference No.: 89000774
- NJRHP No.: 851

Significant dates
- Added to NRHP: July 5, 1989
- Designated NHL: December 4, 1991
- Designated NJRHP: May 22, 1989

Paulsdale is a historic estate and house museum in Mount Laurel Township, New Jersey. Built about 1840, it was the birthplace and childhood home of Alice Paul (1885-1977), a major leader in the Women's suffrage movement in the United States. Her activism led to passage of the Nineteenth Amendment to the United States Constitution, that granted women the right to vote. On July 5, 1989, Paulsdale was added to the National Register of Historic Places and in 1991 it was designated a National Historic Landmark.

== History ==
The main house at Paulsdale was built about 1840 by Benjamin Hooton. The Paul family purchased the 173-acre (70.01 ha) farm homestead around 1883. The property remained in the Paul family until 1958, and served as a sort of "home base" for activist Alice Paul, who was born here in 1885. For much of her adult life she lived an itinerant lifestyle, driven by her activism for women's suffrage. Paulsdale was a place she regularly returned to, holding meetings and strategy sessions for her campaigns. It was sold out of the family in 1958, after her brother's death.

During the 1950s, the property was divided into two parcels: 167 acres (67.58 ha) of farmland and the remaining 6 acres (2.4 ha) which included the main house and farm buildings. The larger became a housing development, while the smaller remained a private residence until it was purchased by the Alice Paul Institute in 1990.

The house has been restored to the condition when Alice Paul lived there. It now serves as a historic house museum and a home for the institute. The purpose of the institute is to make sure Alice Paul's legacy survives by enhancing the knowledge of future generations on the topic of human rights.

== See also ==
- List of monuments and memorials to women's suffrage
- Barbara Haney Irvine, who led the campaign to purchase Paulsdale through the Alice Paul Institute
- List of National Historic Landmarks in New Jersey
