= Louise Slaughter =

American politician (1929–2018)

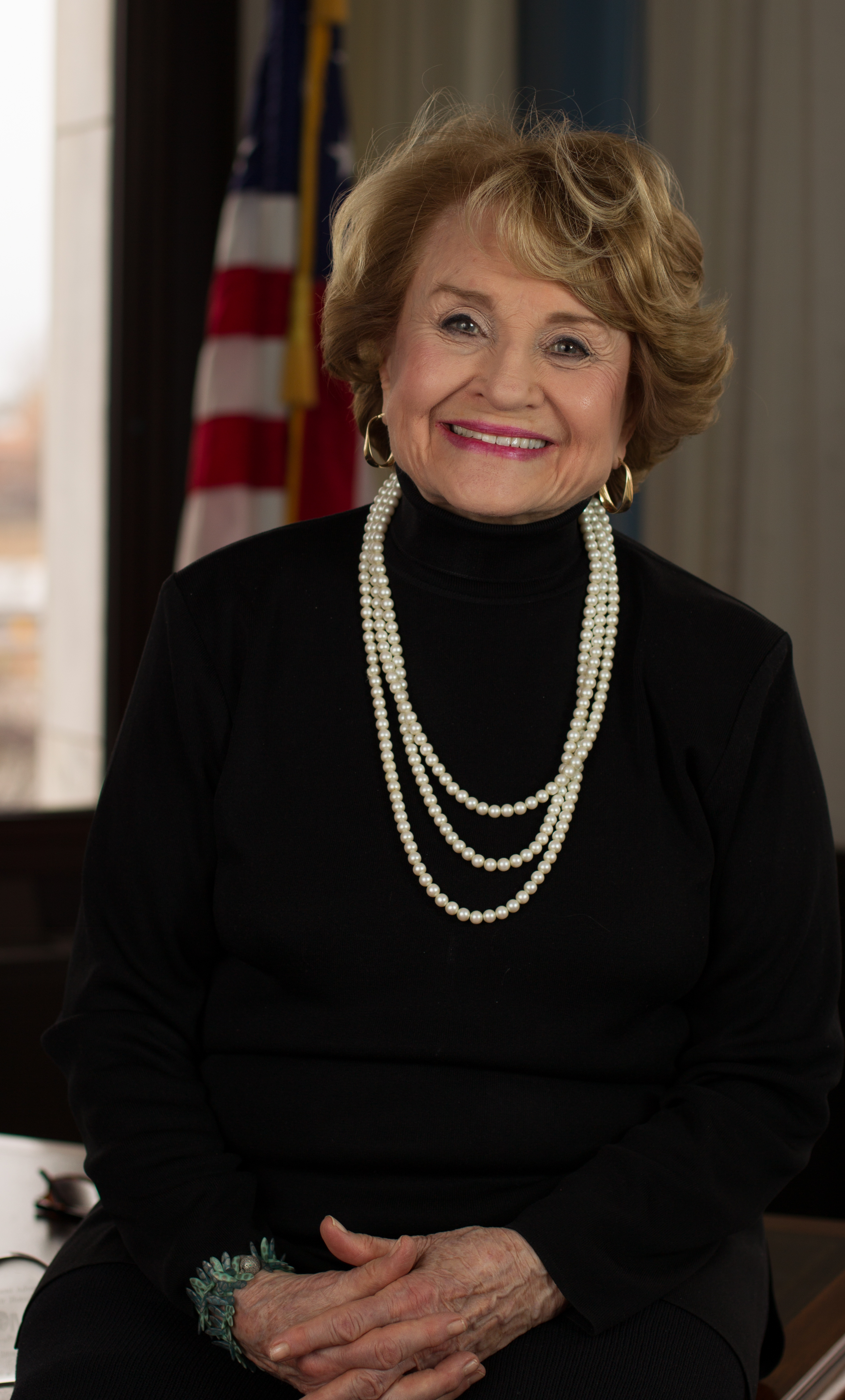
- Official portrait, 2016

Chair of the House Rules Committee
- In office January 3, 2007 – January 3, 2011
- Preceded by: David Dreier
- Succeeded by: David Dreier

Member of the U.S. House of Representatives from New York
- In office January 3, 1987 – March 16, 2018
- Preceded by: Fred J. Eckert
- Succeeded by: Joseph Morelle
- Constituency: 30th district (1987–1993); 28th district (1993–2013); 25th district (2013–2018)

Member of the New York State Assembly from the 130th district
- In office January 1, 1983 – December 31, 1986
- Preceded by: Thomas A. Hanna
- Succeeded by: Robert L. King

Personal details
- Born: Dorothy Louise McIntosh; August 14, 1929 Lynch, Kentucky, U.S.
- Died: March 16, 2018 (aged 88) Washington, D.C., U.S.
- Party: Democratic
- Spouse: Robert Slaughter (m. 1957; died 2014)
- Children: 3
- Education: University of Kentucky (BS, MS)
- Slaughter's voice Slaughter opposing exempting detainee abuse photographs from the Freedom of Information Act. Recorded October 15, 2009

Dorothy Louise Slaughter (née McIntosh, August 14, 1929 – March 16, 2018) was an American politician elected to 16 terms as a United States representative from New York, serving from 1987 until her death in 2018.

Slaughter was born in Lynch, Kentucky. She studied microbiology and public health at the University of Kentucky, earning both a bachelor's degree and a master's degree. After moving to New York and becoming involved in politics as a member of the Democratic Party, she was elected to a seat in the New York State Assembly in 1982 and to the U.S. House of Representatives in 1986. Slaughter represented Rochester and most of surrounding Monroe County; she represented the 30th district from 1987 to 1993, the 28th district from 1993 to 2013, and the 25th district from 2013 until her death.

Slaughter served as chair of the House Rules Committee from 2007 until 2011; she was also the ranking minority member of the Committee from 2005 to 2007, and from 2011 until her death. Slaughter was the lead House sponsor of the Genetic Information Nondiscrimination Act, which became law in 2008. Along with Senator Joe Biden she co-sponsored the Violence Against Women Act. At the time of her death, Slaughter was the oldest sitting member of Congress and the last sitting member born in the 1920s.

== Early life, education, and early career ==
Slaughter was born Dorothy Louise McIntosh on August 14, 1929, in Lynch, Kentucky, a coal mining town built by a subsidiary of U.S. Steel. She was the daughter of Daisy Grace (née Byers) and Oscar Lewis McIntosh, a blacksmith for a coal mine. She had two brothers, Philip and David, as well as two sisters, Marjorie and Virginia. Her sister Virginia died of pneumonia while she was a child; Slaughter later cited this as her reason for earning degrees in microbiology and public health. Slaughter graduated from Somerset High School in Somerset, Kentucky.

Slaughter graduated from high school and enrolled at the University of Kentucky in Lexington, Kentucky, where she studied microbiology. Inspired by the loss of her sister to pneumonia, she earned a bachelor's degree in bacteriology. She went on to earn a master's degree in public health, also from the University of Kentucky. Completed in 1954, her master's thesis focused on the overuse and misuse of antibiotics. After graduate school, Slaughter went to work for Procter & Gamble in New York doing market research.

== Early political career ==
Slaughter was first elected to the Monroe County Legislature in 1975. Upon taking office, she was one of only two female members of the county legislature. In 1975, while serving in the county legislature, she accepted an offer from then-New York Secretary of State Mario Cuomo to serve as his regional coordinator in the Rochester area. When Cuomo was elected lieutenant governor in 1979, Slaughter stayed on as his Rochester regional coordinator.

In 1982, local Democratic supporters approached Slaughter with a desire to see her run to represent the 130th District in the New York State Assembly against the Republican incumbent, Thomas A. Hanna. Slaughter challenged Hanna, and she won with 52 percent of the vote. In 1984, she ran for reelection against the Republican and Conservative parties' candidate Donald S. Milton. She was re-elected with 55 percent of the vote. Slaughter sat in the 185th and 186th New York State Legislatures.

== U.S. House of Representatives ==
=== Elections ===
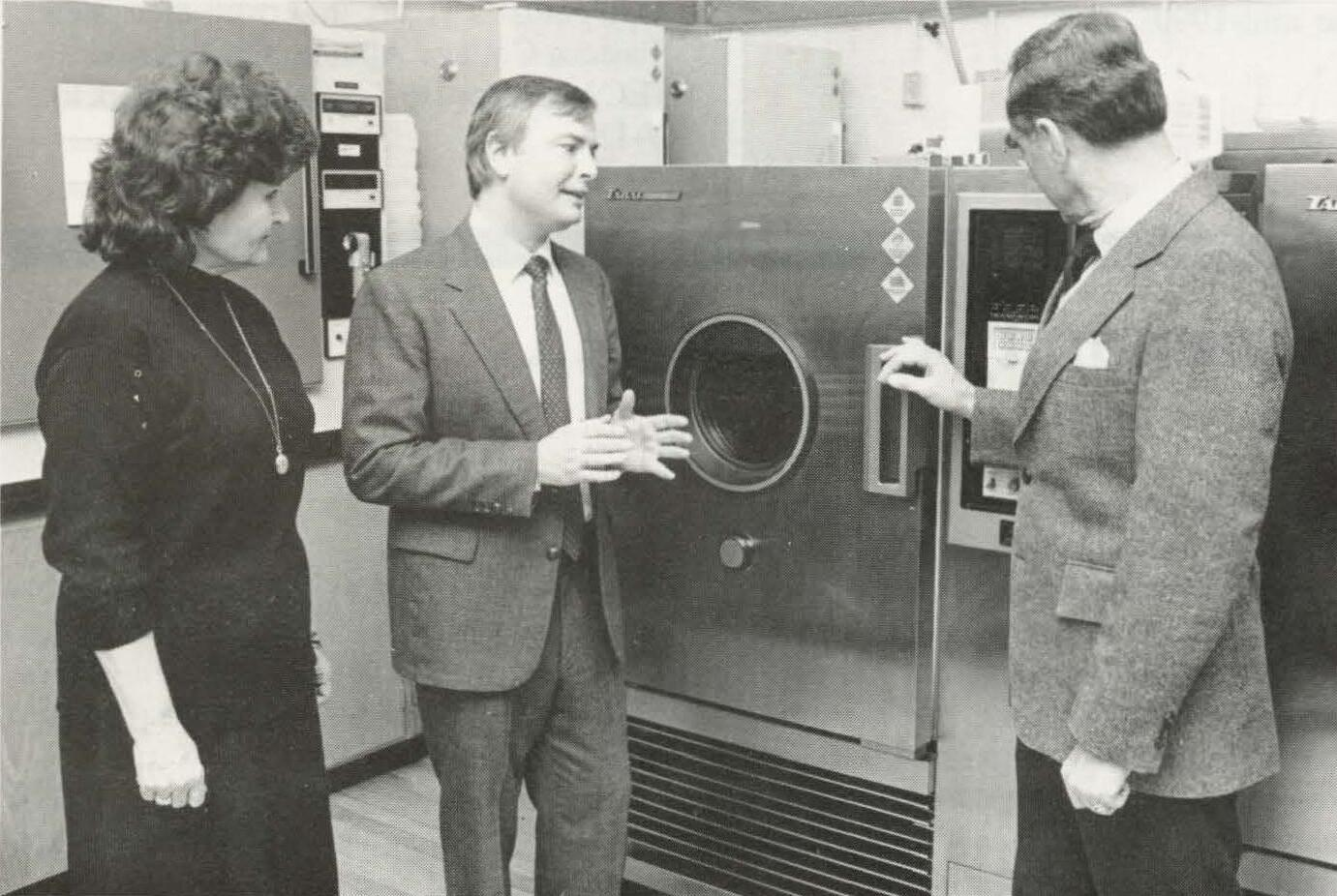
Slaughter visiting a lab at the Rochester Institute of Technology in 1988

After four years in the Assembly, Slaughter decided to run for the Democratic nomination in New York's 30th congressional district. At the time, the district included downtown and eastern Rochester, most of eastern Monroe County, all of Genesee County and northern Livingston and Ontario counties. Moderate Republican Barber Conable had represented the district for 20 years before giving way in 1985 to a considerably more conservative Republican, Fred J. Eckert. Slaughter defeated Eckert by one point in the 1986 midterm election.

After becoming the first Democrat to represent the district since 1963, Slaughter ran against a young member of the Monroe Country Legislature, 33-year old John D. Bouchard. As her district continued its transition from a Republican stronghold, her supporters came out in droves in the 1988 Congressional Election, with her gaining nearly 40,000 more votes than she did in 1986, winning with 56.9% of the vote. Her opponent John D. Bouchard, received one of the highest vote totals tallied against Slaughter for the duration of her time in Washington.

Redistricting after the 1990 census renumbered Slaughter's district as the 28th District and turned it into a much more compact district comprising a narrow ribbon in Monroe County. In the process, she picked up the remainder of Rochester. At the same time, the neighboring 29th District of 30-year incumbent Republican Frank Horton, a close friend of Slaughter's, was dismantled, and his home was drawn into the new 28th. The district had already been moving away from its moderate Republican roots, but the new territory made the district solidly Democratic. Horton opted to retire rather than run against Slaughter.

After the 2000 census, much of her district was merged with the 29th District of fellow Democratic Representative John LaFalce, which included Niagara Falls and the northern third of Buffalo. Original plans called for LaFalce's district to be merged with that of Republican Jack Quinn, who represented the other side of Buffalo. The new district retained Slaughter's district number, but was geographically more LaFalce's district. Only a thin tendril in Orleans County connected Rochester to Buffalo. However, LaFalce did not seek a 15th term, effectively handing the seat to Slaughter.

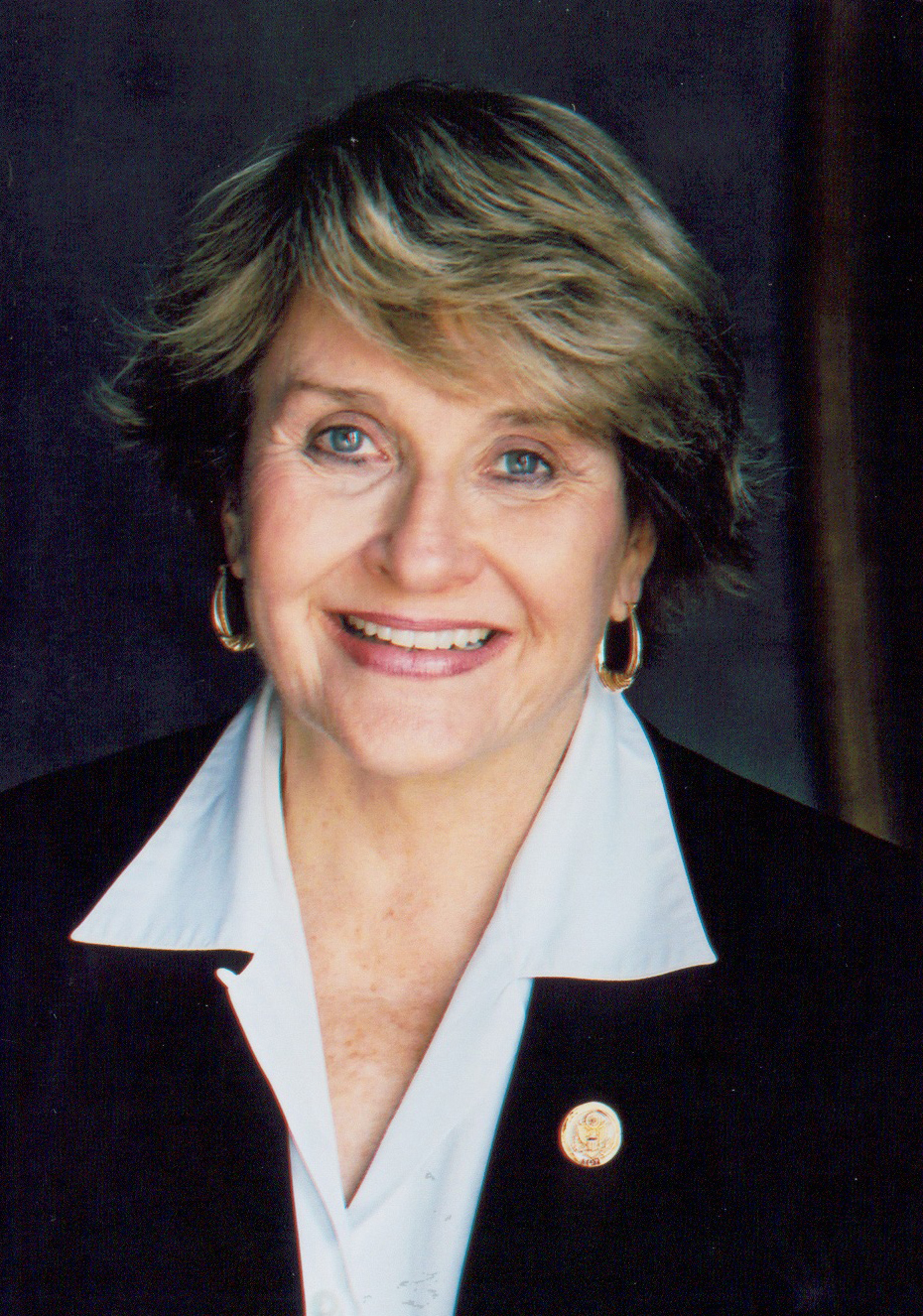
Slaughter during the 109th Congress

Following the 2010 census, Slaughter's district was renumbered as the 25th District. It was significantly more compact than its predecessor, as it took in most of Monroe County and lost its territory near Buffalo. However, it was also slightly less Democratic than her former territory. While President Barack Obama carried the old 28th with 69 percent of the vote, he only received 59 percent of the vote in the new 25th. She faced a vigorous challenge from Republican Monroe County Executive Maggie Brooks, but Slaughter won a 14th term with 57.4% of the vote, on November 6, 2012.

In the 2014 election, Slaughter narrowly defeated her Republican opponent, Gates town supervisor Mark Assini, by 869 votes. After an extended period of vote counting, Assini conceded defeat on November 12, 2014, more than a week after the election was held. It was the first close race that Slaughter had faced since her initial bid for the seat. In a 2016 rematch against Assini, Slaughter prevailed by a 55.7%-44.3% margin.

=== Tenure ===
In January 1987, Slaughter entered Congress. During her entire tenure, she was a "fierce advocate" for medical research, women's health, neurology and genetic rights. In 1993, as a member of the House Budget Committee Slaughter secured the first $500 million earmarked by Congress for breast cancer research at the National Institutes of Health. Slaughter was also a co-sponsor of the National Institutes of Health Revitalization Act of 1993, and fought to ensure the legislation included language guaranteeing that women and minorities were included in all federal health clinical trials from that point forward. Previously, all NIH-funded research was done on white males, even in trials related to predominantly female diseases such as breast cancer. Slaughter fought to include language establishing an Office of Research on Women's Health at NIH in the legislation. Ten years after the creation of ORWH, the National Institutes of Health awarded Slaughter its "Visionary for Women's Health Research" award.

In 1994, along with Senator Joe Biden, Slaughter co-authored the Violence Against Women Act which is designed to reduce incidences of domestic violence in the United States and provide resources to victims.

Congressional letter on Sandra Fluke by Louise Slaughter

Along with Senator Christopher Dodd, she introduced the Women's Progress Commemoration Act, which established the Women's Progress Commemorative Commission in 1998.

After the 2006 mid-term takeover of the House by the Democratic Party, Slaughter was chosen to serve as Chairwoman of the United States House Committee on Rules at the start of the 110th Congress. She was the first woman in history to chair the Rules Committee, and she served in that capacity until 2011.

In 2007, Slaughter introduced the Preservation of Antibiotics for Medical Treatment Act (PAMTA), which would limit the use of antibiotics in livestock feed, to counter the threat of antibiotic resistant bacteria. She has reintroduced her legislation in every subsequent session of Congress. The legislation would phase out the use of eight major classes of antibiotics in healthy food-producing animals, while allowing their use for treatment of sick animals. She cited her scientific training as the impetus for her dedicated interest on the topic, stating in an interview, "It wasn't that I was far-seeing then that they were going to use antibiotics in agriculture. But I have worked on preserving antibiotics for decades."

Slaughter strongly supported the Genetic Information Nondiscrimination Act of 2008. She introduced the bill repeatedly over a period of 14 years before it was signed into law on May 21, 2008. The Genetic Information Nondiscrimination Act is designed to prohibit discrimination by employers or health insurers based upon an individual's genetic information.

In 2009, Slaughter wrote to the United States Department of Defense requesting an investigation into faulty body armor after reading an article in The New York Times, entitled, "Pentagon Study Links Fatalities to Body Armor." The article authored by Michael Moss reported that up to 80 percent of Marines who were killed in Iraq from wounds to the upper body could have survived if they had extra body armor. Slaughter's request resulted in the Department of Defense launching an investigation, recalling 16,000 pieces of body armor and replacing them with safer armor.

Slaughter was chairwoman of the House Committee on Rules during the writing of the Patient Protection and Affordable Care Act and managed the rule for the legislation on the House Floor. In March 2010, Slaughter proposed that a House rule be passed to expedite the passage of health care reform legislation. The rule allows the House to deem the Senate version of the health care reform bill "already passed" by the House without the House holding a recorded vote on the bill. Critics, who called the strategy the "Slaughter Solution", charged this proposed strategy was an affront to democratic principles and challenged its constitutionality. Ultimately this legislative strategy was never used to pass the Patient Protection and Affordable Care Act through the House. Supporters observed that the courts had affirmed the rule's constitutionality, and that Republicans had used the rule repeatedly to pass major legislation such as the Patriot Act and the Tax Relief Reconciliation Act.

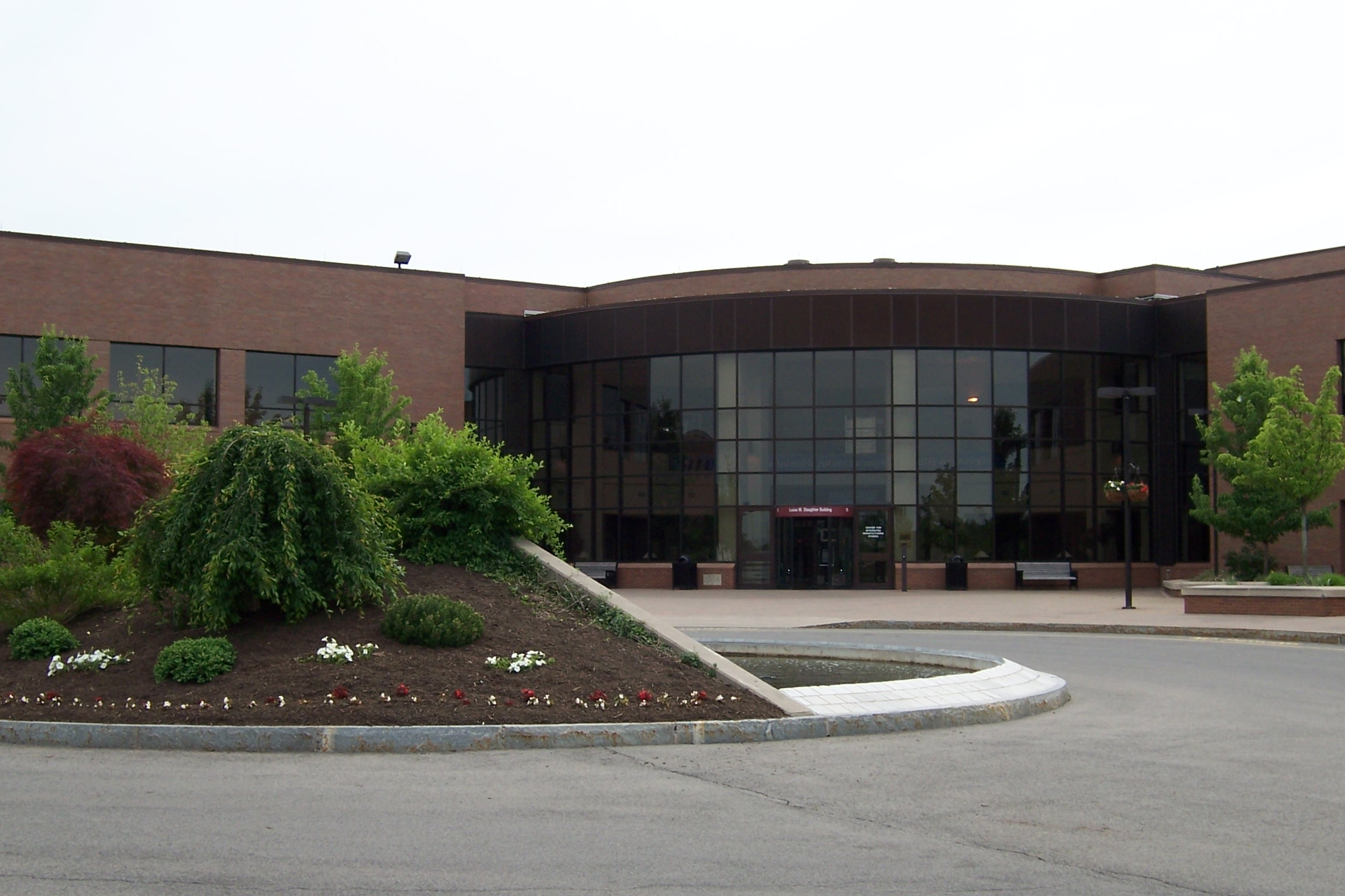
The Louise M. Slaughter Building on the RIT campus

In 2011, Slaughter secured $62.5 million in federal funding for the Laboratory for Laser Energetics at University of Rochester. Slaughter's efforts to secure funds for her district was recognized by the Rochester Institute of Technology when it named its Center for Integrated Manufacturing Studies facilities in her honor. During the same year, with the potential of a government shutdown looming, Slaughter referenced H.R. 358, introduced by Rep. Joseph Pitts during the 112th Congress, when she said at a pro-choice rally, "This is probably one of the worst times that we've seen because the numbers of people who are elected to Congress. I went through this as co-chair of the Arts Caucus. In '94, people were elected simply to come here to kill the National Endowment for the Arts. Now they're here to kill women".

After the shooting of Arizona congresswoman Gabby Giffords in January 2011, Slaughter suggested the Federal Communications Commission was "not working anymore" and called for better policing of incendiary language.

During the 112th Congress, the Stop Trading on Congressional Knowledge Act, or STOCK Act, which Slaughter first authored and introduced into Congress in 2006 – was passed into law. The law prohibits the use of non-public information for private profit, including insider trading by members of Congress and other government employees, and requires many financial transactions by members of Congress to be reported within 45 days.

Slaughter was one of the most liberal and progressive members of the New York congressional delegation from upstate New York, and in the 110th Congress, was the most progressive member of the entire House of Representatives according to the National Journal.

Slaughter was one of several Democratic members of Congress who posted at Daily Kos, a Democratic-oriented blog. She was a member of the Congressional Progressive Caucus. She was the oldest member of Congress at the time of her death.

=== Committee assignments and caucus memberships ===
- United States House Committee on Rules (Ranking Member)

Party leadership

- At-Large Whip

Caucus memberships

- Congressional Arts Caucus Co-chair
- Congressional Bipartisan Pro-Choice Caucus-Co-chair
- House Baltic Caucus
- Afterschool Caucuses
- Congressional NextGen 9-1-1 Caucus

Slaughter was a member of a variety of congressional caucuses. She was a former Co-Chair of the Congressional Caucus for Women's Issues.

== Personal life and death ==
While traveling for work, she met Robert "Bob" Slaughter in San Antonio, Texas, and married him in 1957. After marrying, the couple moved to Fairport, New York, a suburb of Rochester, where Bob had been offered a job. The couple had three daughters. Bob Slaughter died in May 2014, aged 82. She was an Episcopalian.

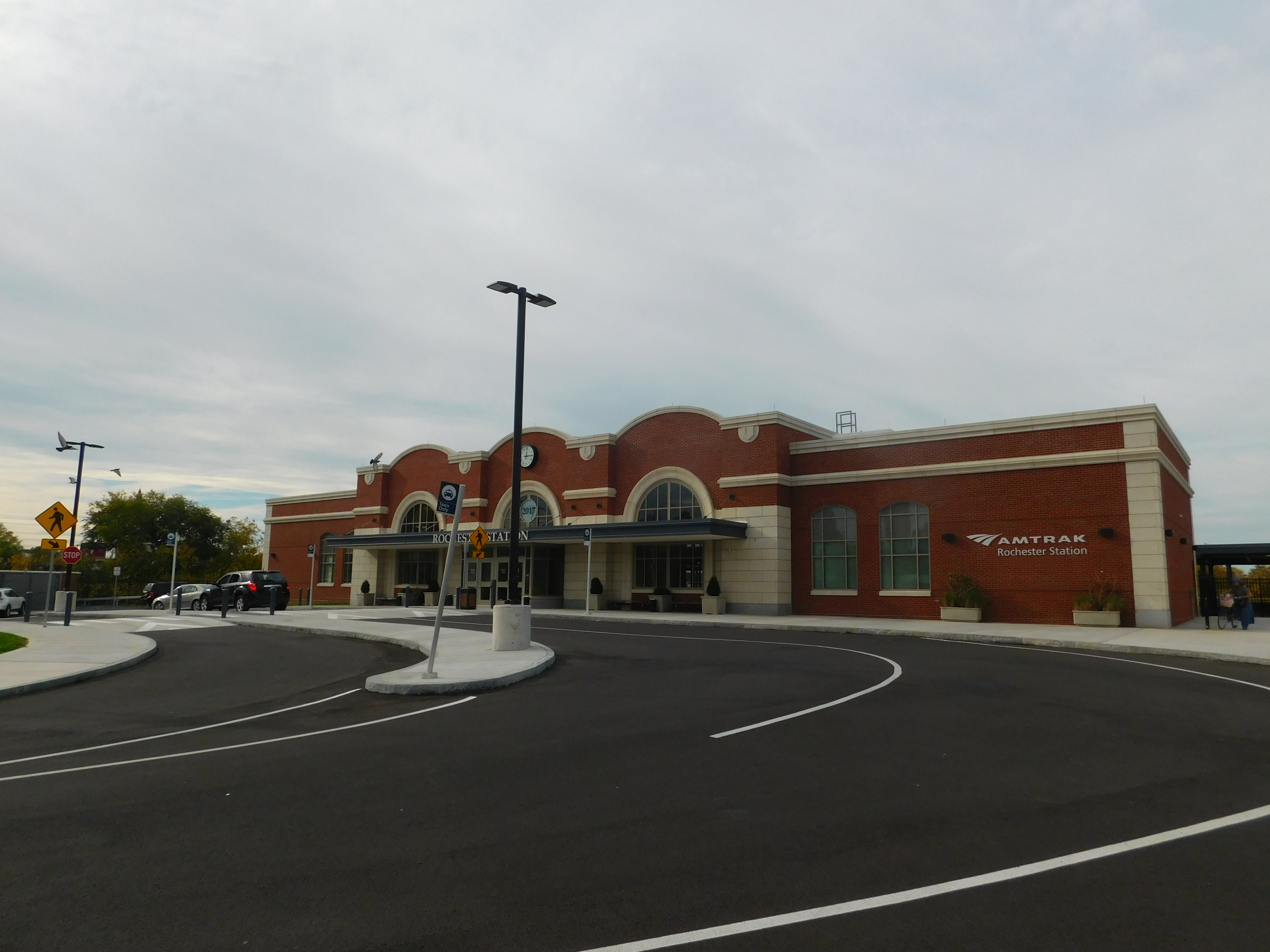
Louise M. Slaughter Rochester Station

To the day she died, Slaughter still spoke with a marked Kentucky accent, which took many by surprise when they learned she represented a Western New York district.

On March 14, 2018, Slaughter was admitted to George Washington University Hospital after suffering a concussion in a fall at her home in Washington, D.C. Two days later, on March 16, Slaughter died at the age of 88.

Slaughter's funeral was held at the Eastman Theater in Downtown Rochester. The funeral was attended by more than 2,000 people and featured speakers such as House of Representatives Minority Leader Nancy Pelosi, Congressman John Lewis, former Senator and Secretary of State Hillary Rodham Clinton, and members of Slaughter's family. The event was also broadcast live on local television channels Spectrum News, WHAM-TV and WHEC-TV.

A day after Slaughter's death, Senators Chuck Schumer and Kirsten Gillibrand, along with former New York Lieutenant Governor and former Rochester mayor Bob Duffy, asked Amtrak to rename its Rochester station in Slaughter's honor. Slaughter had played a significant part in securing the funding for replacing Amtrak's 1970s-vintage station with a new multimodal station that opened in 2017. Four days later, Amtrak announced that it would rename the station. The station was renamed the Louise M. Slaughter Rochester Station on March 25, 2019.

== Electoral history ==
Monroe County Legislature

| Year | Democratic Party | Result | Republican Party | Result | Other | Result |
|---|---|---|---|---|---|---|
| 1971 | Louise M. Slaughter | 3,507 (43.34%) | Walter G.A. Muench (i) | 3,998 (49.41%) | Other | 585 (7.23%) |
| 1973 | Louise M. Slaughter | 4,082 (49.31%) | Walter G.A. Muench (i) | 4,195 (50.68%) | —N/a | —N/a |
| 1975 | Louise M. Slaughter | 4,698 (51.45%) | Walter G.A. Muench (i) | 4,433 (48.54%) | —N/a | —N/a |

Key: (i) = Incumbent
Source: Monroe County Board of Elections

State Assembly

| Year | Democratic Party | Result | Republican Party | Result | Other | Result |
|---|---|---|---|---|---|---|
| 1982 | Louise M. Slaughter | 23,236 (52.18%) | Thomas A. Hanna (i) | 21,289 (47.81%) | —N/a | —N/a |
| 1984 | Louise M. Slaughter (i) | 30,556 (54.79%) | Donald S. Milton | 24,703 (44.29%) | Other | 506 (.90%) |

Key: (i) = Incumbent
Source: New York State Board of Elections

Congressional

| Year | Democratic Party | Result | Republican Party | Result | Other | Result |
|---|---|---|---|---|---|---|
| 1986 | Louise M. Slaughter | 86,777 (50.99%) | Fred J. Eckert (i) | 83,402 (49.00%) | —N/a | —N/a |
| 1988 | Louise M. Slaughter (i) | 128,364 (56.87%) | John D. Bouchard | 89,126 (39.48%) | Other | 8,222 (3.64%) |
| 1990 | Louise M. Slaughter (i) | 97,280 (59.02%) | John M. Regan Jr. | 67,534 (40.97%) | —N/a | —N/a |
| 1992 | Louise M. Slaughter (i) | 140,908 (53.97%) | William P. Polito | 112,273 (43.003%) | Other | 7,897 (3.02%) |
| 1994 | Louise M. Slaughter (i) | 110,987 (56.63%) | Renee Forgensi Davison | 78,516 (40.06%) | Other | 6,464 (3.29%) |
| 1996 | Louise M. Slaughter (i) | 133,084 (57.25%) | Geoff H. Rosenberger | 99,366 (42.74%) | —N/a | —N/a |
| 1998 | Louise M. Slaughter (i) | 118,856 (64.78%) | Richard A. Kaplan | 56,443 (30.76%) | Other | 8,159 (4.47%) |
| 2000 | Louise M. Slaughter (i) | 151,688 (65.70%) | Mark C. Johns | 83,445 (36.14%) | Other | 3,820 (1.65%) |
| 2002 | Louise M. Slaughter (i) | 99,057 (62.45%) | Henry F. Wojtaszek | 59,547 (37.54%) | —N/a | —N/a |
| 2004 | Louise M. Slaughter (i) | 159,655 (72.61%) | Michael D. Laba | 54,543 (24.81%) | Other | 5,678 (2.58%) |
| 2006 | Louise M. Slaughter (i) | 111,386 (73.17%) | John E. Donnelly | 40,844 (26.83%) | —N/a | —N/a |
| 2008 | Louise M. Slaughter (i) | 172,655 (78.00%) | David W. Crimmen | 48,690 (22.00%) | —N/a | —N/a |
| 2010 | Louise M. Slaughter (i) | 102,514 (64.9%) | Jill Rowland | 55,392 (35.1%) | —N/a | —N/a |
| 2012 | Louise M. Slaughter (i) | 179,810 (57.4%) | Maggie Brooks | 133,389 (42.5%) | —N/a | —N/a |
| 2014 | Louise M. Slaughter (i) | 96,803 (50.2%) | Mark Assini | 95,932 (49.8%) | —N/a | —N/a |
| 2016 | Louise M. Slaughter (i) | 169,179 (55.7%) | Mark Assini | 134,285 (44.3%) | —N/a | —N/a |

Key: (i) = Incumbent
Source: New York State Board of Elections

== Awards ==
- Foremother Award from National Center for Health Research, 2014
- Induction into the National Women's Hall of Fame, 2019

== See also ==
- Self-executing rule
- List of members of the United States Congress who died in office (2000–present)#2010s
- Women in the United States House of Representatives

U.S. House of Representatives
| Preceded by Fred J. Eckert | Member of the U.S. House of Representatives from New York's 30th congressional district 1987–1993 | Succeeded by Jack Quinn |
| Preceded by Matthew F. McHugh | Member of the U.S. House of Representatives from New York's 28th congressional district 1993–2013 | Constituency abolished |
| Preceded by Ann Marie Buerkle | Member of the U.S. House of Representatives from New York's 25th congressional district 2013–2018 | Succeeded by Joe Morelle |
| Preceded by David Dreier | Chair of the House Rules Committee; 2007–2011 | Succeeded by David Dreier |
| Preceded by David Dreier | Ranking Member of the House Rules Committee; 2011–2018 | Succeeded by Jim McGovern |
Honorary titles
| Preceded by John Conyers | Oldest member of the U.S. House of Representatives; 2017–2018 | Succeeded by Sam Johnson |
