= Women's Progress Commemorative Commission =

The Women's Progress Commemorative Commission is a U.S. bipartisan commission established pursuant to the Women's Progress Commemoration Act (Public Law 105–341, 1998-10-31) under President Bill Clinton. The bill was introduced by Congresswoman Louise Slaughter and Senator Chris Dodd. The commission was tasked with identifying and preserving sites significant to American women's history. It was established in honor of the 150 year anniversary of the Seneca Falls Convention. The commission's first meeting was held 2000-07-12 in Seneca Falls, New York to develop a scope. Subsequent meetings, some sponsored by the National Park Service, included discussions regarding assistance from United States governors as well as problems with data collection.

== Recommendations ==
- Create and maintain a national database of women's history sites
- Create a data field on the National and State Registers of Historic Places that identifies women's history sites
- Support a public-private partnership network to provide technical assistance for preservation and interpretation of women's historic sites
- Establish an incentive program for State Historic Preservation Offices to encourage them to identify and preserve women's history sites
- Create Statewide, Regional or Community Women's History Trails
- Encourage owners of women's history sites to document, highlight and seek opportunities for preservation and maintenance of their property at time of sale
- Include young people in women's history site activities
