= Alice Paul =

American activist (1885–1977)

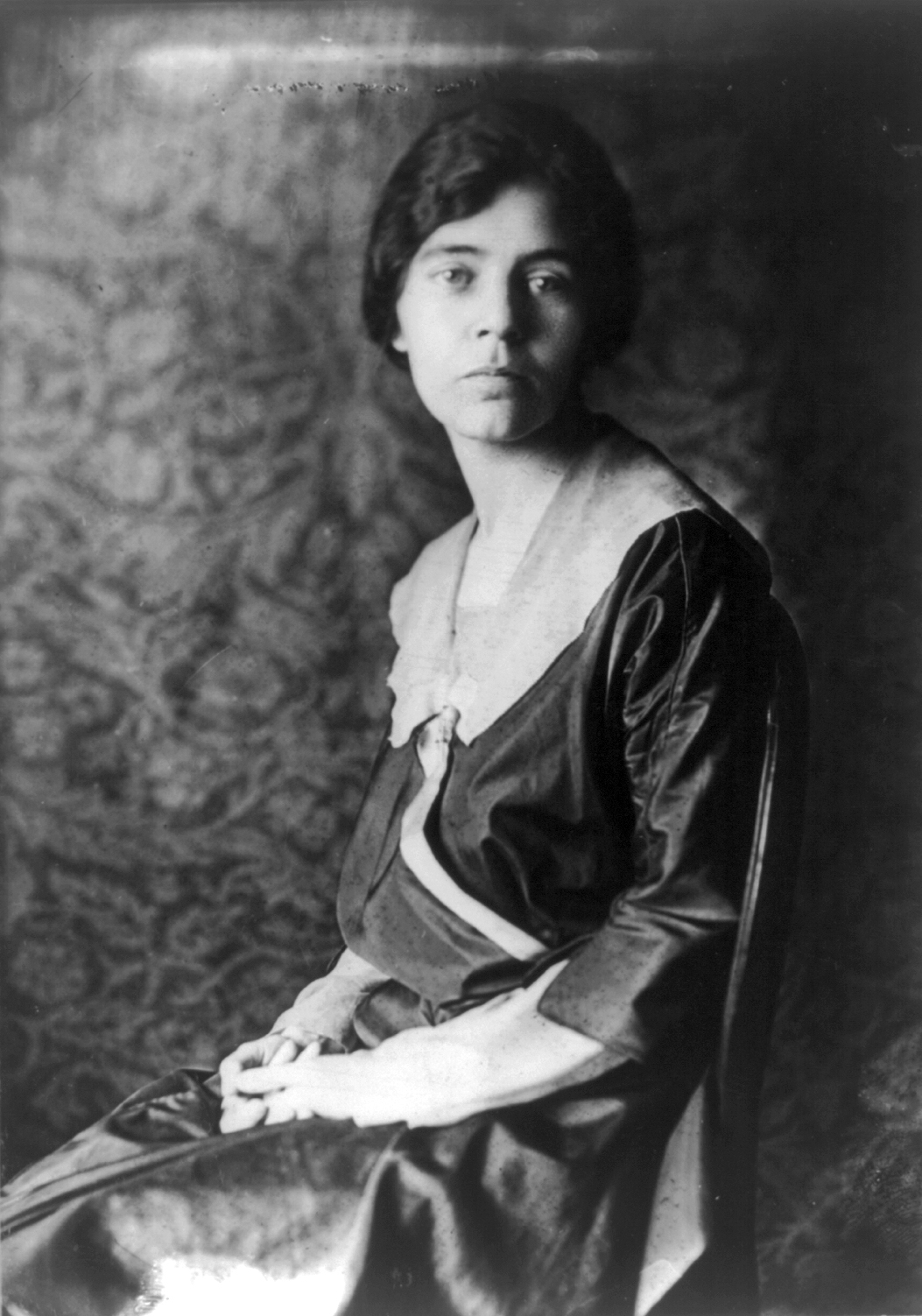
- Paul in 1918
- Born: Alice Stokes Paul; January 11, 1885; Mount Laurel, New Jersey, U.S.
- Died: July 9, 1977 (aged 92); Moorestown, New Jersey, U.S.
- Resting place: Westfield Friends Burial Ground, Cinnaminson, New Jersey, U.S.
- Education: Swarthmore College (BS); Woodbrooke Quaker Study Centre; London School of Economics; University of Pennsylvania (MA, PhD); American University (LLB, LLM, DCL)
- Occupation: Suffragist
- Political party: National Woman's Party

Alice Stokes Paul (January 11, 1885 – July 9, 1977) was an American Quaker, suffragette, suffragist, feminist, and women's rights activist, and one of the foremost leaders and strategists of the campaign for the Nineteenth Amendment to the United States Constitution, which prohibits sex discrimination in the right to vote. Paul initiated, and along with Lucy Burns and others, strategized events such as the Woman Suffrage Procession and the Silent Sentinels, which were part of the successful campaign that resulted in the amendment's passage in August 1920.

Paul often suffered police brutality and other physical abuse for her activism, always responding with nonviolence. She was jailed in 1917 for participating in a Silent Sentinels protest in front of the White House, as she had been several times during earlier efforts to secure the vote for women in the United Kingdom.

After 1920, Paul spent a half-century as leader of the National Woman's Party, which fought for passage of the Equal Rights Amendment, drafted by Paul and Crystal Eastman, trying to secure constitutional equality for women. She won a major permanent success with the inclusion of women as a group protected against discrimination by the Civil Rights Act of 1964.

== Early life and education ==
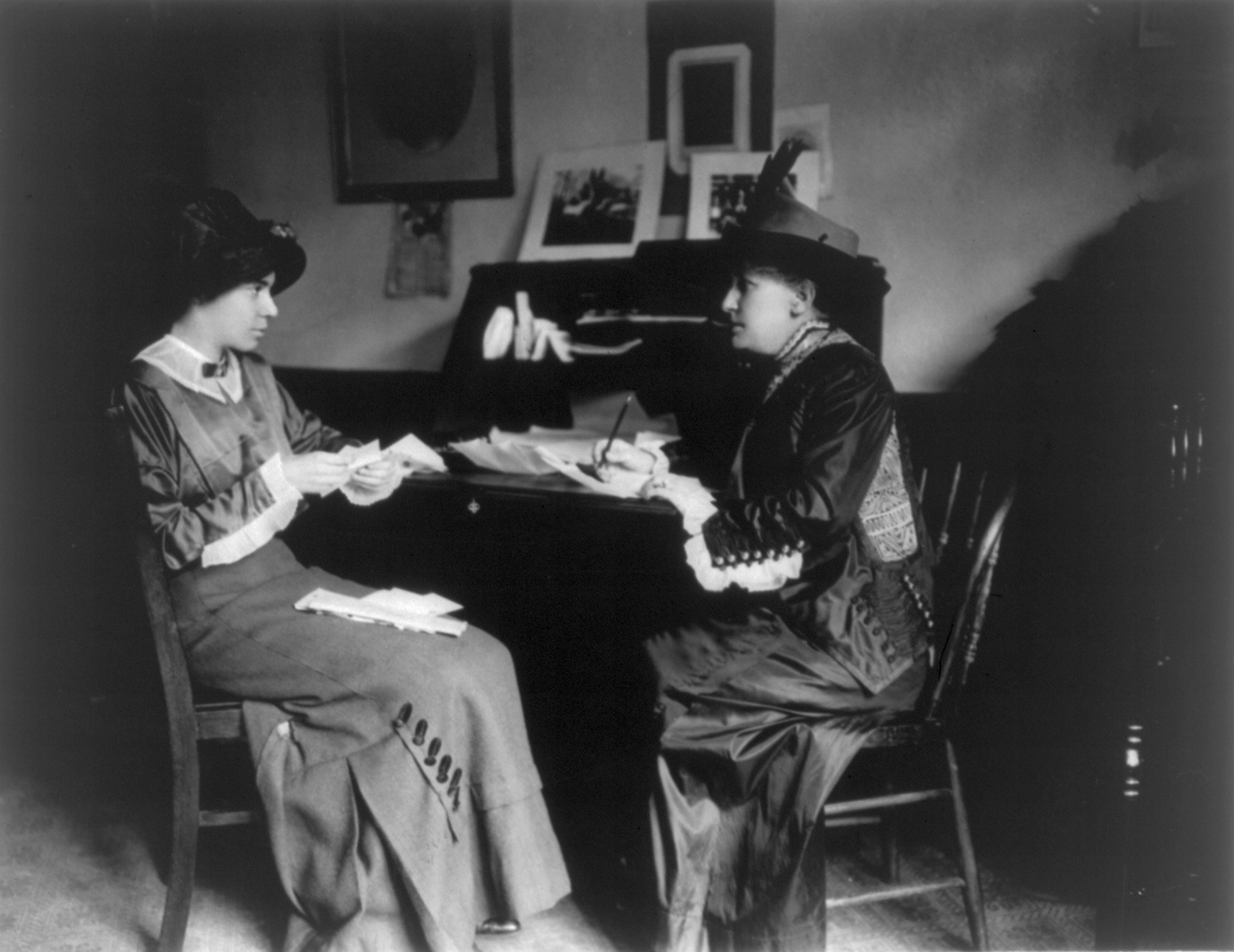
Paul and Helen Gardener, c. 1908–1915

Alice Stokes Paul was born on January 11, 1885, to William Mickle Paul I and Tacie Parry Paul at Paulsdale in Mount Laurel Township, New Jersey. She was a namesake of Alice Stokes, her maternal grandmother and the wife of William Parry. Her siblings were Willam Mickle Paul II, Helen Paul Shearer, and Parry Haines Paul. She grew up in the Quaker tradition of public service; Alice Paul first learned about women's suffrage from her mother, a member of the National American Woman Suffrage Association (NAWSA), and would sometimes join her mother in attending suffragist meetings.

Paul attended nearby Moorestown Friends School, where she graduated at the top of her class. In 1901, she entered Swarthmore College, which had been co-founded in 1864 by her grandfather and other Hicksite Friends. While at Swarthmore, Paul served on the executive board of Student Government, an experience which may have sparked her excitement for political activism. She graduated from Swarthmore with a bachelor's degree in biology in 1905.

After graduation, partly to avoid going into teaching, Paul pursued a fellowship year in New York City, living on the Lower East Side at the Rivington Street Settlement House. Working in the settlement movement reinforced her determination to right perceived injustices in America, but Paul soon realized that social work was not the way she was to achieve this goal: "I knew in a very short time I was never going to be a social worker, because I could see that social workers were not doing much good in the world ... you couldn't change the situation by social work."

In 1907, after completing coursework in political science, sociology, and economics, Paul earned a Master of Arts degree from the University of Pennsylvania. She continued her studies at the Woodbrooke Quaker Study Centre in Birmingham, England. Paul also took economics classes from the University of Birmingham while continuing to earn money doing social work. It was at Birmingham that she first heard Christabel Pankhurst speak. When Paul later moved to London to study sociology and economics at the London School of Economics, she joined the militant suffrage group the Women's Social and Political Union (WSPU) led by Christabel and her mother, Emmeline Pankhurst. Paul was arrested repeatedly in London during suffrage demonstrations and served three jail terms. After returning from England in 1910, she attended the University of Pennsylvania, earning a Ph.D. in sociology in 1912. Her dissertation was entitled "The Legal Position of Women in Pennsylvania"; it addressed the history of the women's movement in Pennsylvania and the rest of the U.S. and urged woman suffrage as the key issue of the day.

After the ratification of the Nineteenth Amendment, Paul enrolled at two law schools, taking day and evening classes to finish more quickly. In 1922, Paul received her LL.B degree from the Washington College of Law at American University. In 1927, she earned a master of laws degree, and in 1928, a doctorate in civil law from American University.

== Career ==
=== Britain ===
==== Early work in British woman suffrage ====
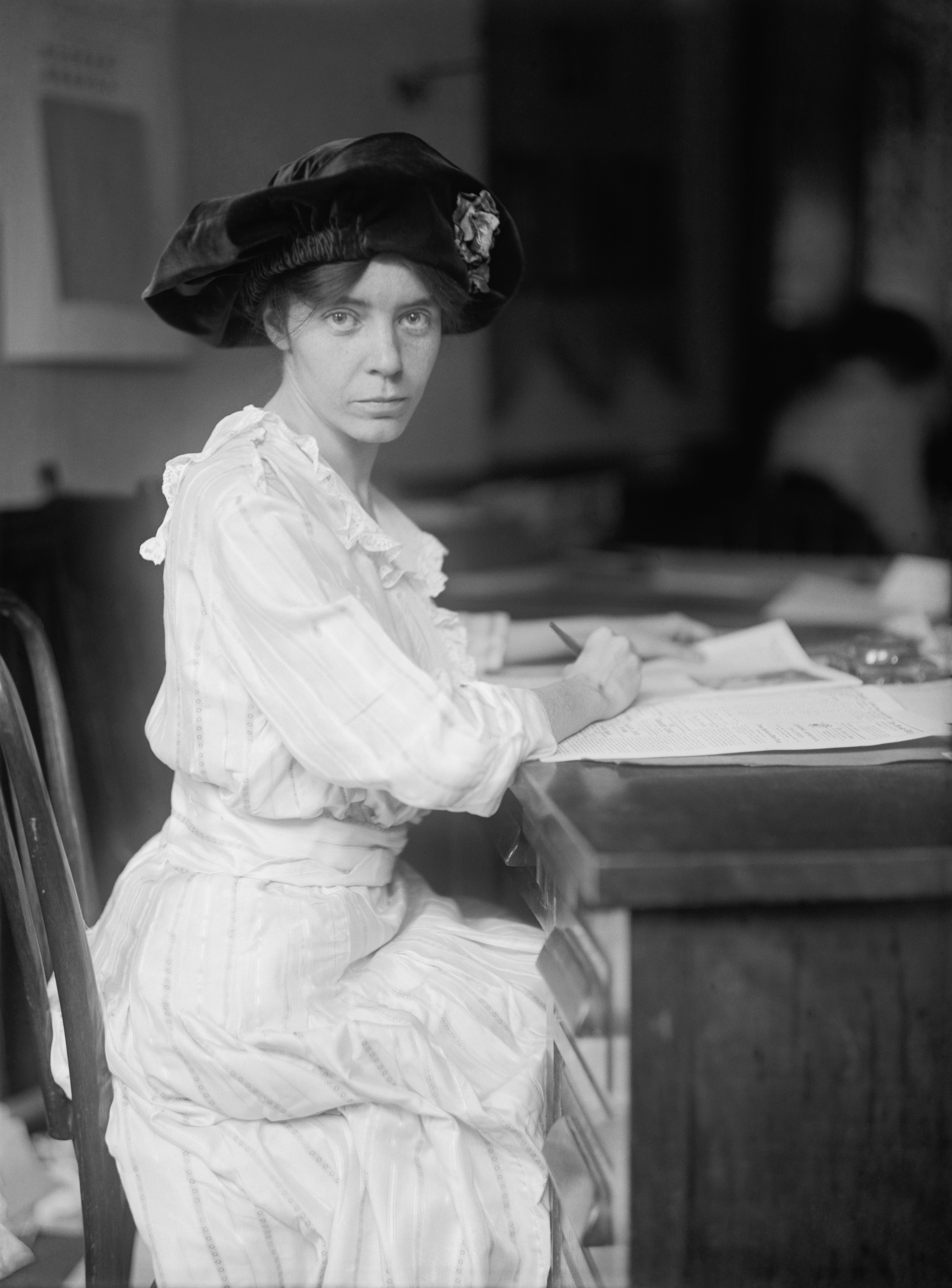
Paul in 1915

In 1907, after completing her master's degree at the University of Pennsylvania, Paul moved to England, where she eventually became deeply involved with obtaining women's suffrage in the United Kingdom, regularly participating in demonstrations and marches of the Women's Social and Political Union (WSPU). After a "conversion experience" seeing Christabel Pankhurst speak at the University of Birmingham, Paul became enamored of the movement. She first became involved by selling a suffragist magazine on street corners. Considering the animosity towards the suffragettes, this was an arduous task and opened her eyes to the abuse women involved in the movement faced. These experiences, combined with the teachings of Professor Beatrice Webb, convinced Paul that social work and charity could not bring about the needed social changes in society: this could only be accomplished through equal legal status for women.

While in London, Paul also met Lucy Burns, a fellow American activist, while arrested in a British police station, who would become an essential ally for the duration of the suffrage fight, first in England, then in the United States. The two women impressed prominent WSPU members and began organizing events and campaign offices. When Emmeline Pankhurst attempted to spread the movement to Scotland, Paul and Burns accompanied her as assistants.

Paul gained the trust of fellow WSPU members through her talent with visual rhetoric and her willingness to put herself in physical danger to increase the visibility of the suffrage movement. While at the WSPU's headquarters in Edinburgh, Paul and local suffragettes made plans to protest a speech by the Minister of Foreign Affairs, Sir Edward Grey. For a week prior, they spoke with people on the streets to promote knowledge about why they were protesting against the Cabinet member. After Grey discussed proposed legislation he claimed would lead to prosperity at the meeting, Paul stood up and exclaimed: "Well, these are very wonderful ideals, but couldn't you extend them to women?" Police responded by dragging her out of the meeting and through the streets to the police station, where she was arrested. As planned, this act was viewed by many as a public silencing of legitimate protest and increased press coverage and public sympathy.

Later events involved even more risk of bodily harm. Before a political meeting at St. Andrew's Hall in Glasgow in August 1909, Paul camped out on the hall's roof so that she could address the crowd below. When police forced her to descend, crowds cheered her effort. Later, when Paul, Burns, and fellow suffragettes attempted to enter the event, they were beaten by police as sympathetic bystanders attempted to protect them. After Paul and her fellow protesters were taken into custody, crowds gathered outside the police station demanding the women's release.

On November 9, 1909, in honor of Lord Mayor's Day, the Lord Mayor of London hosted a banquet for cabinet ministers in the city's Guild Hall. Paul planned the WSPU's response; she and Amelia Brown disguised themselves as cleaning women and entered the building with the normal staff at 9:00 am. Once in the building, the women hid until the event started that evening. Then they came out of hiding and "took their stand". When Prime Minister H. H. Asquith stood to speak, Brown threw her shoe through a pane of stained glass, and both women yelled, "Votes for women!" Following this event, both women were arrested and sentenced to one-month hard labor after refusing to pay fines and damages for the window damage. She was imprisoned at Holloway Prison in London.

==== Civil Disobedience and Hunger Strikes ====
Whilst associated with the Women's Social and Political Union, Paul was arrested a total of seven times and imprisoned three times. It was during her time in prison that she learned the tactics of civil disobedience from Emmeline Pankhurst. Chief among these tactics was demanding to be treated as a political prisoner upon arrest. This not only sent a message about the legitimacy of the suffragists to the public but also had the potential to provide tangible benefits. In many European countries, including England, political prisoners were given a special status: "[T]hey were not searched upon arrest, not housed with the rest of the prisoner population, not required to wear prison garb, and not force-fed if they engaged in hunger strikes." Though arrested suffragists often were not afforded the status of political prisoners, this form of civil disobedience provided much press for the WSPU. For example, during a London arrest (after being denied political prisoner status), Paul refused to put on prisoner's clothing. After the prison matrons could not undress her forcibly, they requested assistance from male guards. This act, considered shockingly improper by Victorian era standards, provided extensive press coverage for the suffrage movement.

Another popular civil disobedience tactic used by the suffragists was hunger striking. The first WSPU-related hunger strike was conducted by sculptor Marion Wallace Dunlop in June 1909. By that fall, it was being widely used by WSPU members because of its effectiveness in publicizing their mistreatment and gaining quick release from prison wardens. Refusing food worked in securing an early release for Paul during her first two arrests. However, during her third prison stint, the warden ordered twice daily force-feeding to keep Paul strong enough to finish her month-long sentence.

Though the prisons staunchly maintained that the force-feeding of prisoners was for their own benefit, Paul and other women described the process as torturous. Paul had developed severe gastritis at the end of her month in prison. She was carried out of prison and immediately tended to by a doctor. However, after this event, her health was permanently scarred; she often developed colds and flu, which would sometimes require hospitalization.

Paul had been given a Hunger Strike Medal 'for Valour' by WSPU.

=== United States ===
After the ordeal of her final London imprisonment, Paul returned to the United States in January 1910 to continue her recovery and to develop a plan for suffrage work back home. Paul's experiences in England were well-publicized, and the American news media quickly began following her actions upon her return home. She drew upon the teachings of Woodbrooke and her religion and quickly decided that she wanted to embrace a single goal as a testimony. The single goal she chose was the recognition of women as equal citizens.

Paul reenrolled at the University of Pennsylvania, pursuing her Ph.D. while speaking about her experiences in the British suffrage movement to Quaker audiences and starting to work towards United States suffrage on the local level. After completing her dissertation, a comprehensive overview of the history of the legal status of United States women, she began participating in National American Woman Suffrage Association (NAWSA) rallies, and in April 1910, was asked to speak at NAWSA's annual convention. After this significant opportunity, Paul and Burns proposed to NAWSA leadership a campaign to gain a federal amendment guaranteeing the vote for women. This was wholly contrary to NAWSA's state-by-state strategy. Paul and Burns were laughed at by NAWSA leadership; the only exception was Jane Addams, who suggested that the women tone down their plan. As a response, Paul asked to be placed on the organization's Congressional Committee.

==== 1913 Woman Suffrage Procession ====
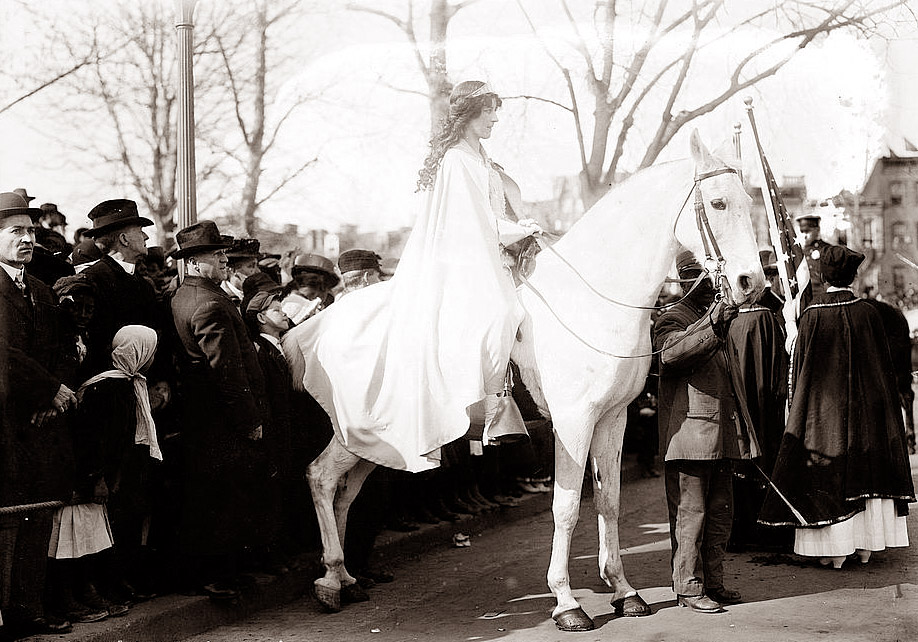
Inez Milholland leading the Woman Suffrage Procession on horseback in 1913

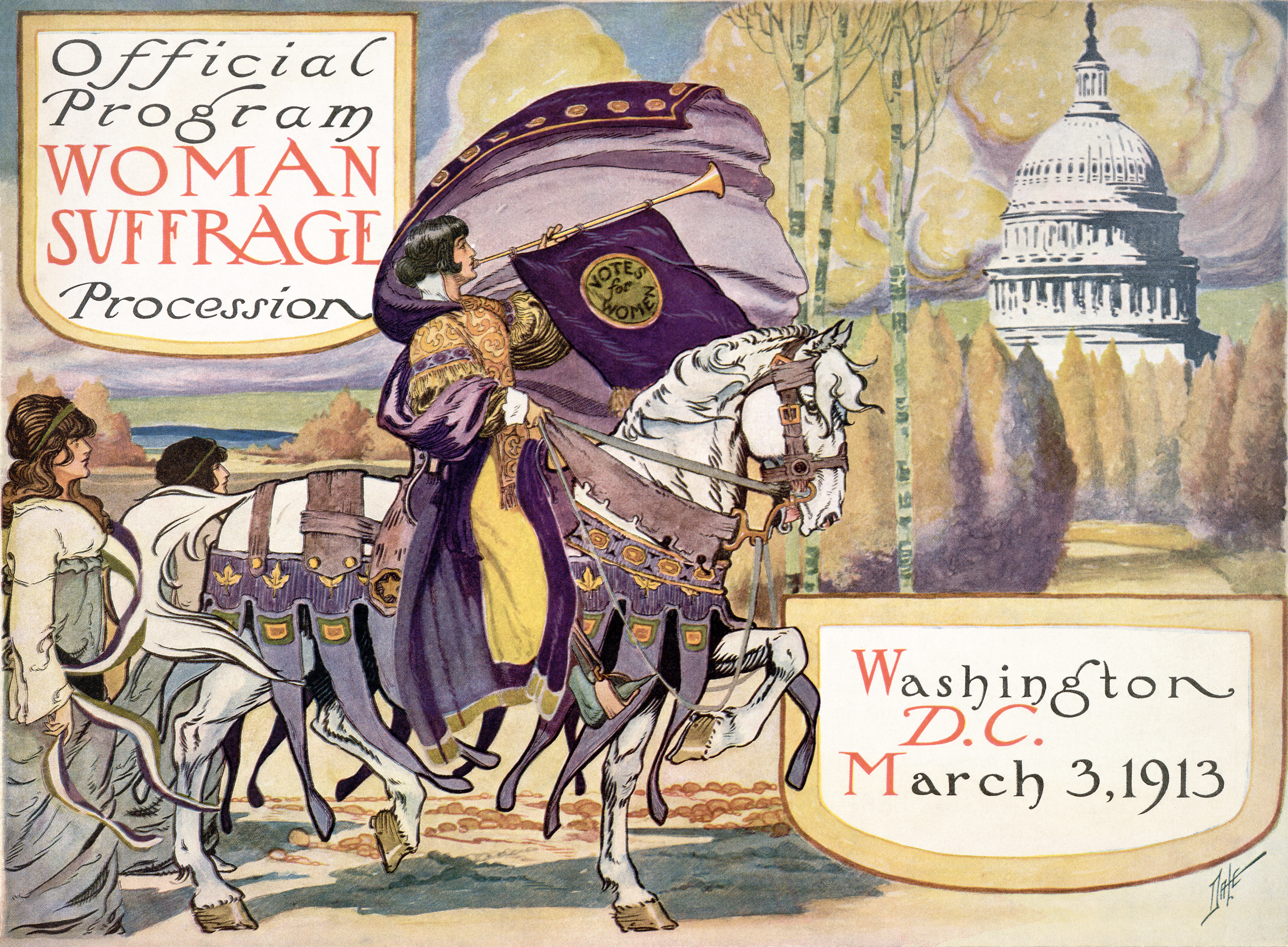
Cover to the program for the 1913 Woman Suffrage Procession, which Paul organized

One of Paul's first big projects was initiating and organizing the 1913 Woman Suffrage Procession in Washington, D.C., the day before President Wilson's inauguration. Paul was determined to pressure Wilson because the office of the President would be able to influence Congress the most. She assigned volunteers to contact suffragists nationwide and recruit supporters to march in the parade. In a matter of weeks, Paul succeeded in gathering roughly eight thousand marchers representing most of the country. However, she had much more trouble gaining institutional support for the protest parade. Paul insisted the parade route go through Pennsylvania Avenue where President Wilson would be. Her goal was to send the message that the push for women's suffrage existed before Wilson and would outlast him if need be. Washington officials originally resisted this route, and according to biographer Christine Lunardini, Paul was the only one who truly believed the parade would take place on that route. Eventually, the city ceded the route to NAWSA. However, the city supervisor claimed that the women would not be safe marching along the Pennsylvania Avenue route and strongly suggested the group move the parade. Paul responded by demanding the city supervisor provide more police, which was not done. On March 3, 1913, the parade gained legitimacy with Congress passing a special resolution ordering the city supervisor to prohibit all ordinary traffic along the parade route and prevent any interference with the suffrage marchers.

On the event day, the procession proceeded along Paul's desired route. The event, which was led by notable labor lawyer Inez Milholland dressed in white and riding a horse, was described by the New York Times as "one of the most impressively beautiful spectacles ever staged in this country". Multiple bands, banners, squadrons, chariots, and floats were also displayed in the parade representing all women's lives. One of the most notable sights was the lead banner in the parade which declared, "We Demand an Amendment to the United States Constitution Enfranchising the Women of the Country." Some participating groups and leaders, however, wanted black and white women's organizations and state delegations to be segregated; after much discussion, NAWSA decided black women could march where they wished. Still, Ida B. Wells was asked not to march with the Illinois delegation; ultimately, she joined the Chicago group and continued the march with the state delegation.

Over half a million people came to view the parade. With insufficient police protection, the situation soon devolved into a near-riot, with onlookers pressing so close to the women that they could not proceed. Police largely did nothing to protect the women from rioters. A senator who participated in the march later testified that he personally took the badge numbers of 22 officers who had stood idle, including two sergeants. Eventually, members of the Massachusetts and Pennsylvania National Guard intervened, and students from the Maryland Agricultural College provided a human barrier to help the women pass. Some accounts even describe Boy Scouts as stepping in and providing first aid to the injured. The incident mobilized public dialogue about the police response to the women's demonstration, producing greater awareness and sympathy for NAWSA.

After the parade, the NAWSA's next focus was lobbying for a constitutional amendment to secure the right to vote for women. Such an amendment had been initially sought by suffragists Susan B. Anthony and Elizabeth Cady Stanton who, as leaders of the NWSA, fought for a federal amendment to the constitution securing women's suffrage until the 1890 formation of NAWSA, which campaigned for the vote on a state-by-state basis.

==== National Woman's Party ====
Paul's militant methods started to create tension between her and the leaders of NAWSA, who thought she was moving too aggressively in Washington. Eventually, disagreements about strategy and tactics led to a break with NAWSA. Paul formed the Congressional Union for Woman Suffrage and, later the National Woman's Party (NWP) in 1916.

The NWP began introducing some of the methods used by the suffrage movement in Britain such as silent sentinels and focused entirely on achieving a constitutional amendment for woman suffrage. Alva Belmont, a multi-millionaire socialite at the time, was the largest donor to Paul's efforts. The NWP was accompanied by press coverage and the publication of the weekly newspaper, The Suffragist.

==== Silent Sentinels ====
In the U.S. presidential election of 1916, Paul and the National Woman's Party (NWP) campaigned in western states where women could already vote against the continuing refusal of President Woodrow Wilson and other incumbent Democrats to actively support the Suffrage Amendment. Paul went to Mabel Vernon to help her organize a picketing campaign. In January 1917, the NWP staged the first political protest and picketing at the White House. Picketing had been legalized by the 1914 Clayton Antitrust Act, so the women were not doing anything illegal. The pickets, participating in a nonviolent civil disobedience campaign known as the "Silent Sentinels", dressed in white, silent and with 2,000 taking part over two years, maintained a presence six days a week, holding banners demanding the right to vote. Paul knew the only way they could accomplish their goal was by displaying the President's attitude toward suffrage, so picketing would achieve this in the best manner. Each day Paul would issue "General Orders", selecting women to be in charge and who would speak for the day. She was the "Commandant", and Mabel Vernon was the "Officer of the Day". Paul created state days to get volunteers for the pickets, such as Pennsylvania Day, Maryland Day, and Virginia Day. She also made special days for professional women, such as doctors, nurses, and lawyers.

After the United States entered World War I in April 1917, many people viewed the picketing Silent Sentinels as disloyal. Paul made sure the picketing would continue. In June 1917, picketers were arrested for "obstructing traffic". Over the next six months, many, including Paul, were convicted and incarcerated at the Occoquan Workhouse in Virginia (which later became the Lorton Correctional Complex) and the District of Columbia Jail.

When the public heard the news of the first arrests, some were surprised that leading suffragists and very well-connected women were going to prison for peacefully protesting. President Wilson received bad publicity from this event and was livid with the position he was forced into. He quickly pardoned the first women arrested on July 19, two days after they had been sentenced, but reporting on the arrests and abuses continued. For example, the Boston Journal stated, "The little band representing the NWP has been abused and bruised by government clerks, soldiers, and sailors until its efforts to attract the President's attention has sunk into the conscience of the whole nation."

Suffragists continued picketing outside the White House after the Wilson pardon and throughout World War I. Their banners contained such slogans as "Mr. President, How Long Must Women Wait For Liberty?" and "We Shall Fight for the Things Which We Have Always Held Nearest Our Hearts—For Democracy, For The Right of Those Who Submit To Authority To Have A Voice in Their Own Governments." The capitalization of each word emphasized the gravity of the situation. With the hope of embarrassing Wilson, some of the banners quoted Wilson's own words against him. Wilson ignored these women, but his daughter Margaret waved in acknowledgment, a major victory for the protesters. Although the suffragists protested peacefully, their protests were sometimes violently opposed. While protesting, young men would harass and beat the women, with the police never intervening on behalf of the protesters. Police would even arrest other men who tried to help the women who were getting beaten. Even though they protested during wartime, they maintained public support by agitating peacefully. More protesters were arrested and sent to Occoquan or the District Jail throughout this time. Pardons were no longer given.

=== Prison, hunger strikes, and passage of Nineteenth Amendment ===
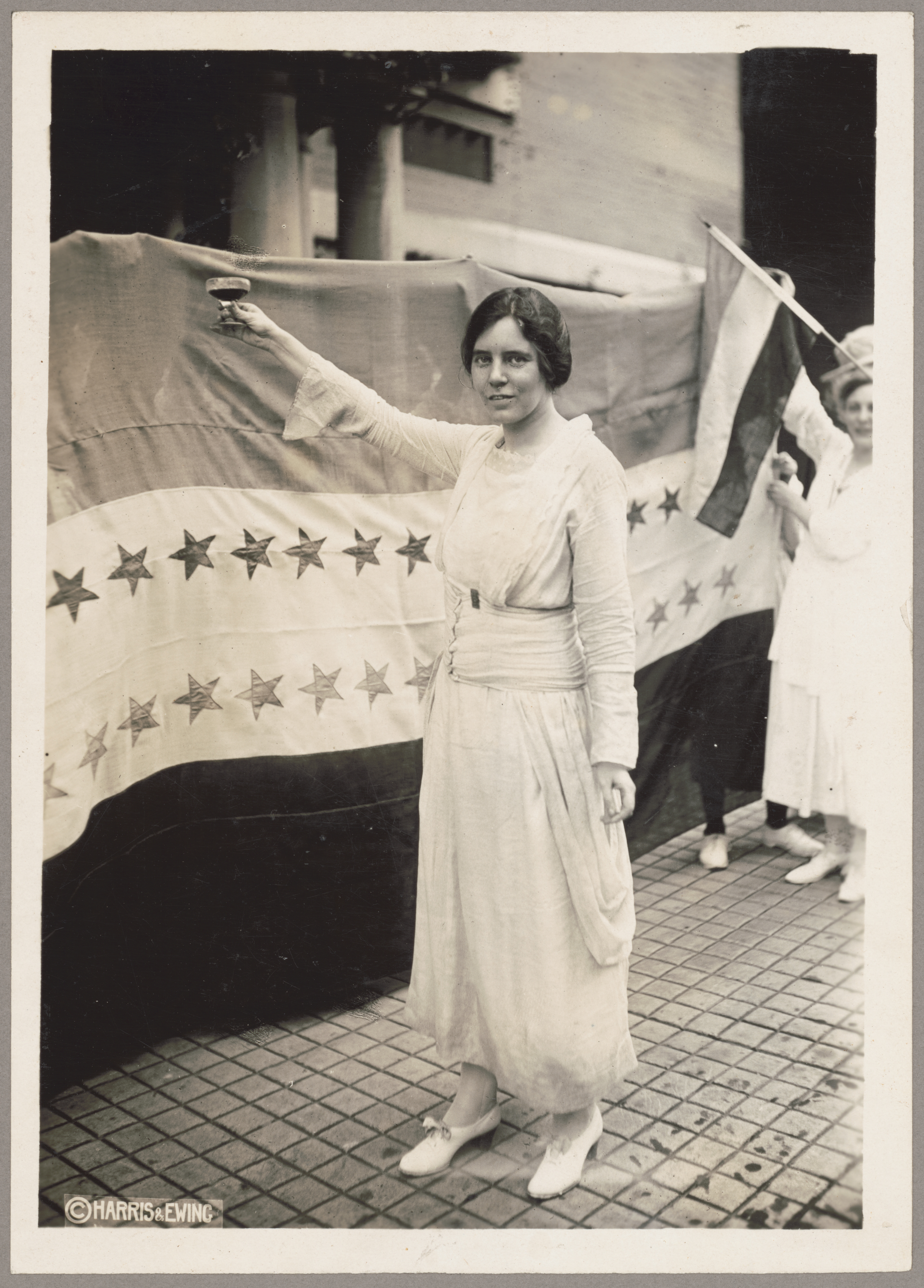
Paul toasting (with grape juice) passage of the Nineteenth Amendment on August 26, 1920

In solidarity with other activists in her organization, Paul purposefully strove to receive the seven-month jail sentence that started on October 20, 1917. She began serving her time in the District Jail.

Whether sent to Occoquan or the District Jail, the women were given no special treatment as political prisoners. They had to live in harsh conditions with poor sanitation, infested food, and dreadful facilities. In protest of the conditions at the District Jail, Paul began a hunger strike. This led to her being moved to the prison's psychiatric ward and being force-fed raw eggs through a feeding tube. "Seems almost unthinkable now, doesn't it?" Paul told an interviewer from American Heritage when asked about forced feeding, "It was shocking that a government of men could look with such extreme contempt on a movement that was asking nothing except such a simple little thing as the right to vote."

On November 14, 1917, the suffragists who were imprisoned at Occoquan endured brutality allegedly endorsed by prison authorities which became known as the "Night of Terror". The National Woman's Party (NWP) went to court to protest the treatment of the women such as Lucy Burns, Dora Lewis, and Alice Cosu, her cellmate in Occoquan Prison, who suffered a heart attack at seeing Dora's condition. The women were later moved to the District Jail where Paul languished. Despite the brutality that she experienced and witnessed, Paul remained undaunted. On November 27 and 28, all the suffragists were released from prison. Within two months, Wilson announced a bill on women's right to vote.

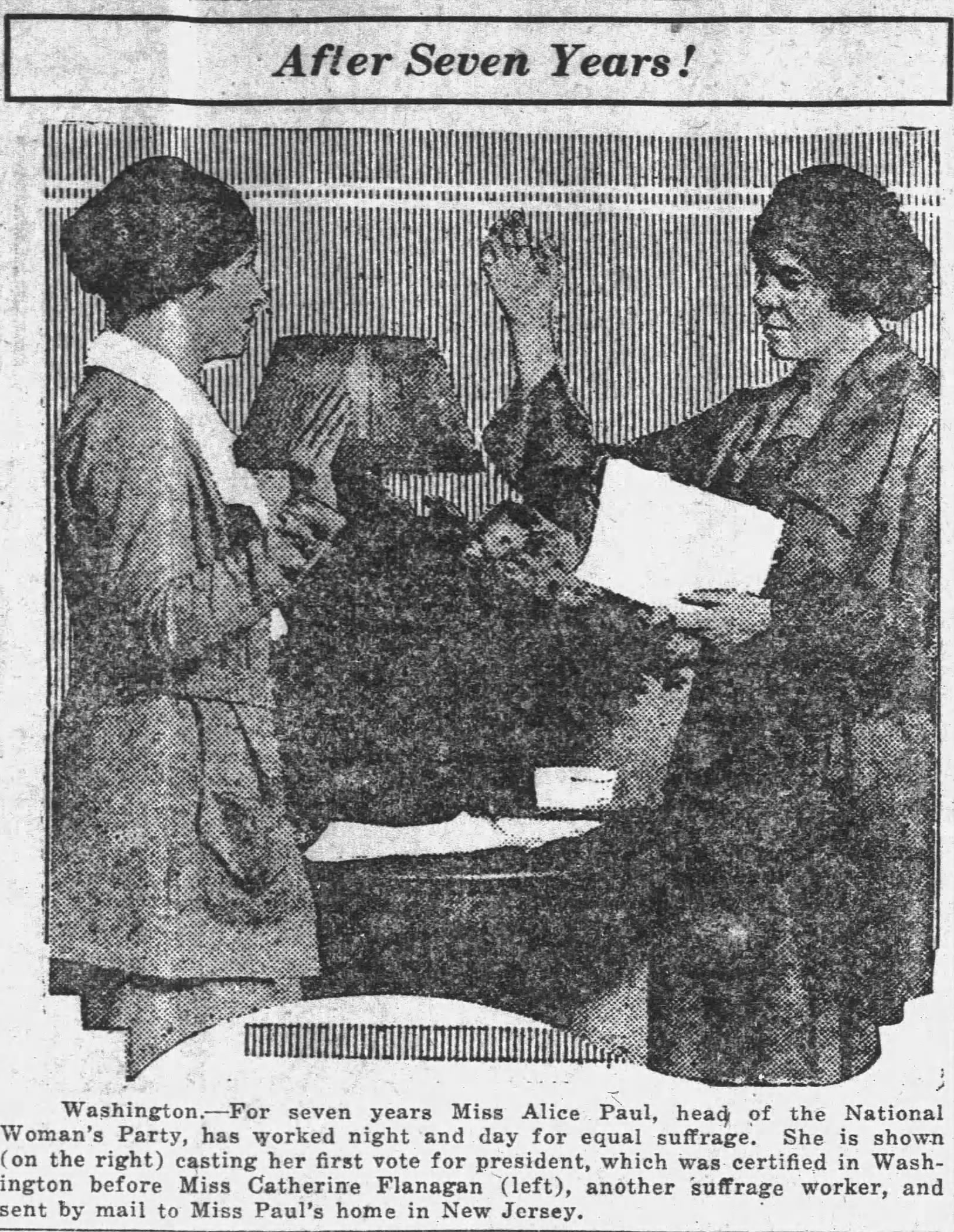
Alice Paul's first vote for president (1920)

=== Post-Suffrage ===
After Suffrage, the National Women's Party (NWP) continued to lobby in Congress and abroad, advocating for legal equality for women. Alice Paul and NWP members successfully lobbied to include equality provisions into the United Nations' charter, such as the phrase "the equal rights of men and women and of nations large and small." NWP is credited with drafting over 300 pieces of legislation that became law. Paul remained in leadership positions, officially and unofficially, until she moved to Connecticut in 1974.

=== Equal Rights Amendment ===
In January 2019, the House and Senate introduced resolutions to remove the deadline for ratification of the Equal Rights Amendment, which was added in 1972 and which Paul accurately predicted would compromise the ERA's chances for success.

Once suffrage was achieved in 1920, Paul and some members of the National Woman's Party shifted attention to constitutional guarantees of equality through the Equal Rights Amendment (ERA), which was written by Paul and Crystal Eastman. Drafted and delivered to Congress in 1923, the original text of the Equal Rights Amendment—which Paul and the National Woman's Party dubbed the "Lucretia Mott Amendment" in honor of this antislavery and suffrage activist of an earlier generation—read, "Men and women shall have equal rights throughout the United States and every place subject to its jurisdiction." In 1943, the amendment was renamed the "Alice Paul Amendment", and contained wording was changed to the version that still exists today: "Equality of rights under the law shall not be denied or abridged by the United States or by any state on account of sex." For Paul, the ERA had the same appeal as suffrage in that it was a constitutional amendment and a single-issue campaign that she believed could and should unite women around a common core goal. Paul understood the value of single-issue politics for building coalitions and securing success.

Not everyone agreed about next steps or the ERA; from the start, the amendment had its critics. While Paul's activism in the years after suffrage centered on securing legal protections for women's equality in the U.S. and abroad, other activists and some members of the NWP focused on a wide range of issues from birth control and air conditioning to educating newly enfranchised women voters. Some of Paul's earlier allies in suffrage found the ERA troubling, especially since they believed it would erode protective legislation—laws about working conditions or maximum hours that protected women in the workplace. If the ERA guaranteed equality, opponents argued, protective legislation for women would be null and void. The rival League of Women Voters (LWV), which championed workplace legislation for women, opposed the Equal Rights Amendment. Paul and her cohorts, including a small group from the NWP, thought that sex-based workplace legislation restricted women's ability to compete for jobs with men and earn good wages. In fact, Paul believed that protective legislation hurt women wage earners because some employers simply fired them rather than implement protections on working conditions that safeguarded women. Women were paid less than men, lost jobs requiring them to work late nights—often a prohibition under protective legislation—and had long been blocked from joining labor unions on par with men. She also believed that women should be treated under the law like men were and not as a class that required protection. To Paul, such protections were merely a form of entrenched "legalized inequality", a position shared by suffragist Harriot Stanton Blatch. To Paul, the ERA was the most efficient way to ensure legal equality. Paul expected women workers to rally behind the ERA; some did, many did not. While early on, there was hope among NWP members that they could craft a bill that would promote equality while also guaranteeing labor protection for women, to Paul, that was a contradiction. What's more, she was surprised when Florence Kelley, Ethel Smith, Jane Addams, and other suffragists parted with her and aligned with protective legislation.

While Paul continued to work with the NWP and even served as president again in the 1940s, she remained steadfastly committed to women's equality as her singular mission. Along with the ERA, Paul worked on behalf of similar efforts in state legislation and international contexts. She helped ensure that the United Nations proclamations include equality for women. She hoped that this would encourage the United States to follow suit. Paul worked to change laws that had altered the status of a woman's citizenship based on that of her husband's. In the U.S., women who married men from foreign countries lost their U.S. citizenship and were considered by the U.S. to be citizens of whatever country their husbands were from. To Paul, this was a violation of equal rights. As such, she successfully worked on behalf of the international Equal Nationality Treaty in 1933 and in the U.S. for the successful passage of the Equal Nationality Act in 1934, which let women retain their citizenship upon marriage. Just after the founding of the United Nations in 1945, Paul wanted to ensure that women's equality was a part of the organization's charter and that its Commission on Human Rights included a focus on women's equality in its Universal Declaration of Human Rights. She prevailed: the final version of the Declaration in 1948 opened with a reference to "equal rights of men and women".

The ERA was introduced in Congress in 1923 and had various peaks and valleys of support in the following years as Paul continued to push for its passage. There were favorable committee reports in Congress in the late 1930s, and with more women working in men's jobs during the war, public support for the ERA also increased. In 1946, the ERA passed by three votes in the Senate, not the majority needed for it to advance. Four years later, it would garner the Senate votes but fail in the House, thereby halting it from moving forward.

Paul was encouraged when women's movement activism gained steam in the 1960s and 1970s, which she hoped would spell victory for the ERA. When the bill finally passed Congress in 1972, Paul was unhappy about the changes in the wording of the ERA that now included time limits for securing its passage. Advocates argued that this compromise—the newly added seven-year deadline for ratification in the states—enabled the ERA's passage in Congress, but Paul accurately predicted that the inclusion of a time limit would ensure its defeat. In addition, this version put enforcement power in the hands of the federal government only; Paul's original and 1943 reworded versions required both states and the federal government to oversee its provisions. Paul's version was politically insightful and strategic: politicians who believed in states' rights, including many Southern states, were more likely to support an ERA that gave states some discretion of enforcement authority than a version that did not. Paul was proved correct: while the ERA did receive a three-year extension from Congress, it remained three states short of those needed for ratification.

States continued to attempt to ratify the ERA long after the deadline passed, including Nevada in 2017 and Illinois in 2018. In 2017 and again in 2019, the Senate and House introduced resolutions to remove the deadline from the ERA. These or similar measures, if passed, according to some experts, would make the amendment viable again, although other experts dispute it.

=== 1964 Civil Rights Act ===
Paul played a significant role in adding protection for women in Title VII of the Civil Rights Act of 1964, despite the opposition of liberals who feared it would end protective labor laws for women. The prohibition on sex discrimination was added to the Civil Rights Act by Howard W. Smith, a powerful Virginia Democrat who chaired the House Rules Committee. Smith's amendment was passed by a teller vote of 168 to 133. For twenty years, Smith had sponsored the Equal Rights Amendment in the House because he believed in equal rights for women, even though he opposed equal rights for blacks. For decades, he had been close to the National Woman's Party, especially to Paul. She and other feminists had worked with Smith since 1945, trying to find a way to include sex as a protected civil rights category.

=== Views on Abortion ===
Alice Paul, like many early feminists and suffragists, was opposed to abortion. Paul was quoted as saying, "Abortion is the ultimate exploitation of women."

== Personal life and death ==
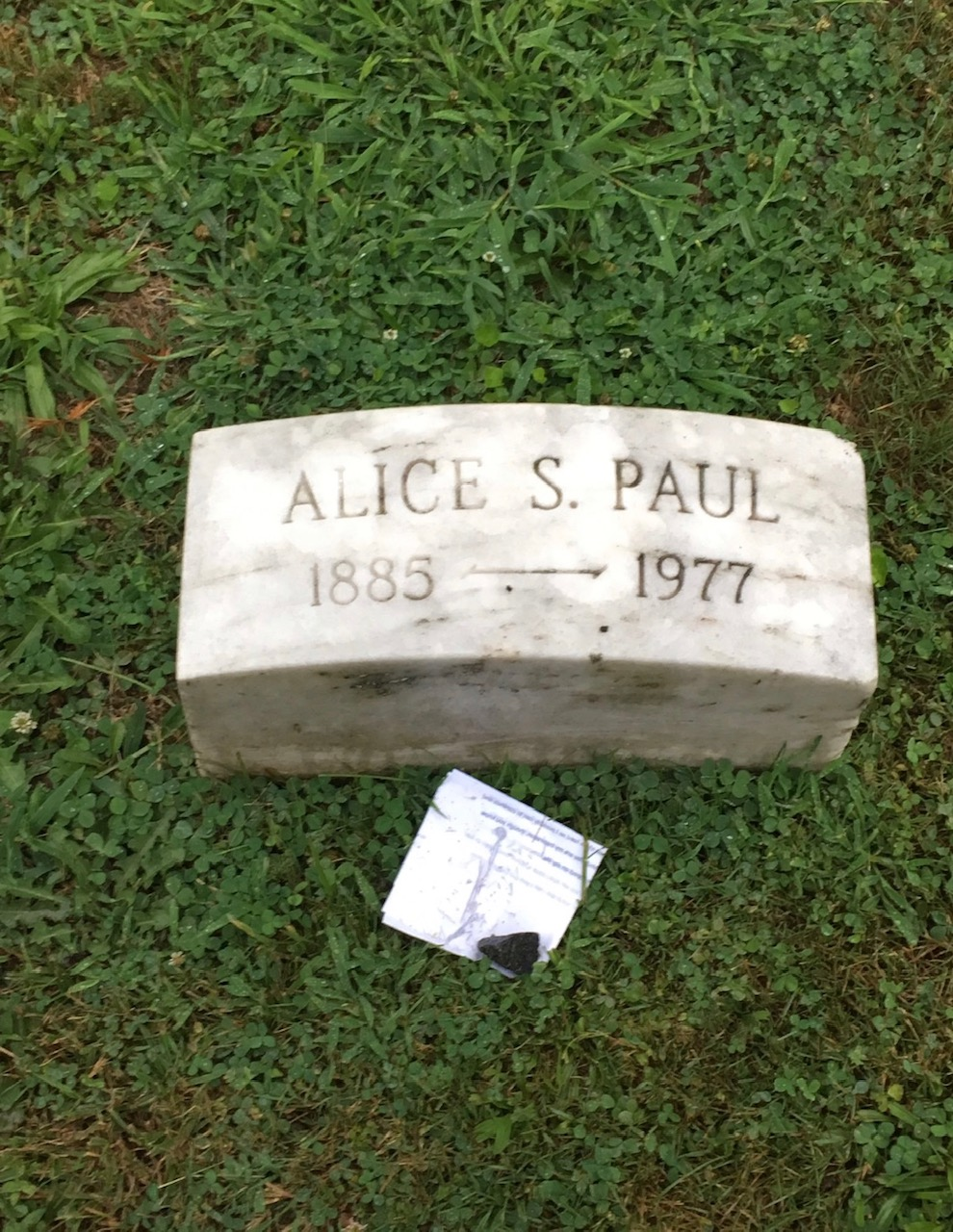
Paul's gravesite in Cinnaminson, New Jersey

Paul had an active social life until she moved to Washington, D.C., in late 1912. She was an active member of the Daughters of the American Revolution. She enjoyed close relationships with women and befriended and occasionally dated men. Paul did not preserve private correspondence for the most part, so few details about her personal life are available. Once Paul devoted herself to winning the vote for women, she placed the suffrage effort first in her life. Nevertheless, Elsie Hill and Dora Kelly Lewis, two women whom she met early in her work for NAWSA, remained close to her all their lives. She knew William Parker, a scholar she met at the University of Pennsylvania, for several years; he may have tendered a marriage proposal in 1917.

Paul became a vegetarian around the time of the suffrage campaign.

In 1974, Paul suffered a stroke and was placed in a nursing home under the guardianship of her nephew, who depleted her estate. News of her penniless state reached friends, and a fund for indigent Quakers quickly aided Paul. Paul died at the age of 92 on July 9, 1977, at the Greenleaf Extension Home a Quaker facility in Moorestown, New Jersey, less than a mile from her birthplace and childhood home. She is buried at Westfield Friends Burial Ground in Cinnaminson, New Jersey. Visitors frequently leave notes at her tombstone to thank her for her lifelong work on behalf of women's rights.

== Legacy ==
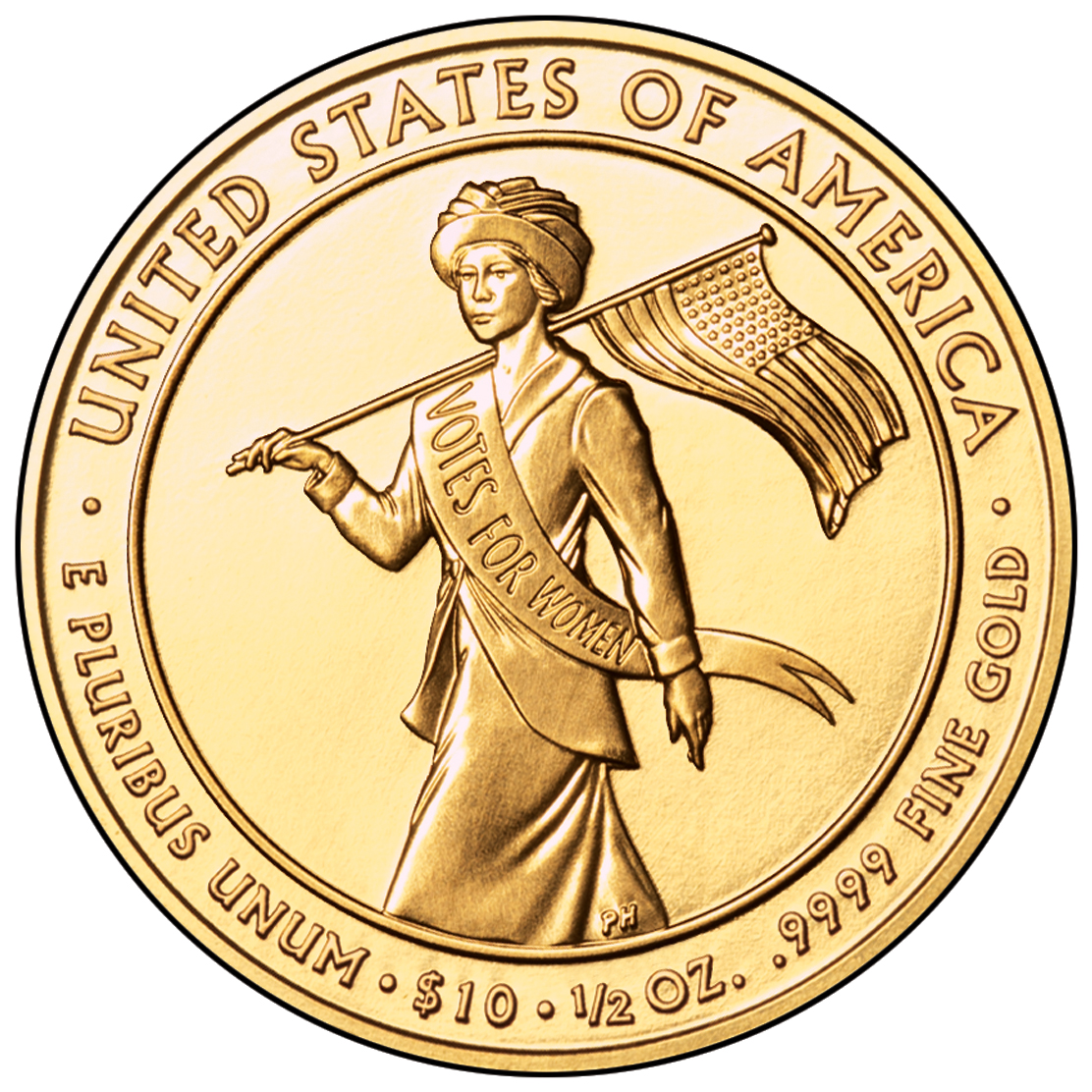
Paul depicted on the 2012 First Spouse program ten-dollar coin as a substitute for a president having no spouse

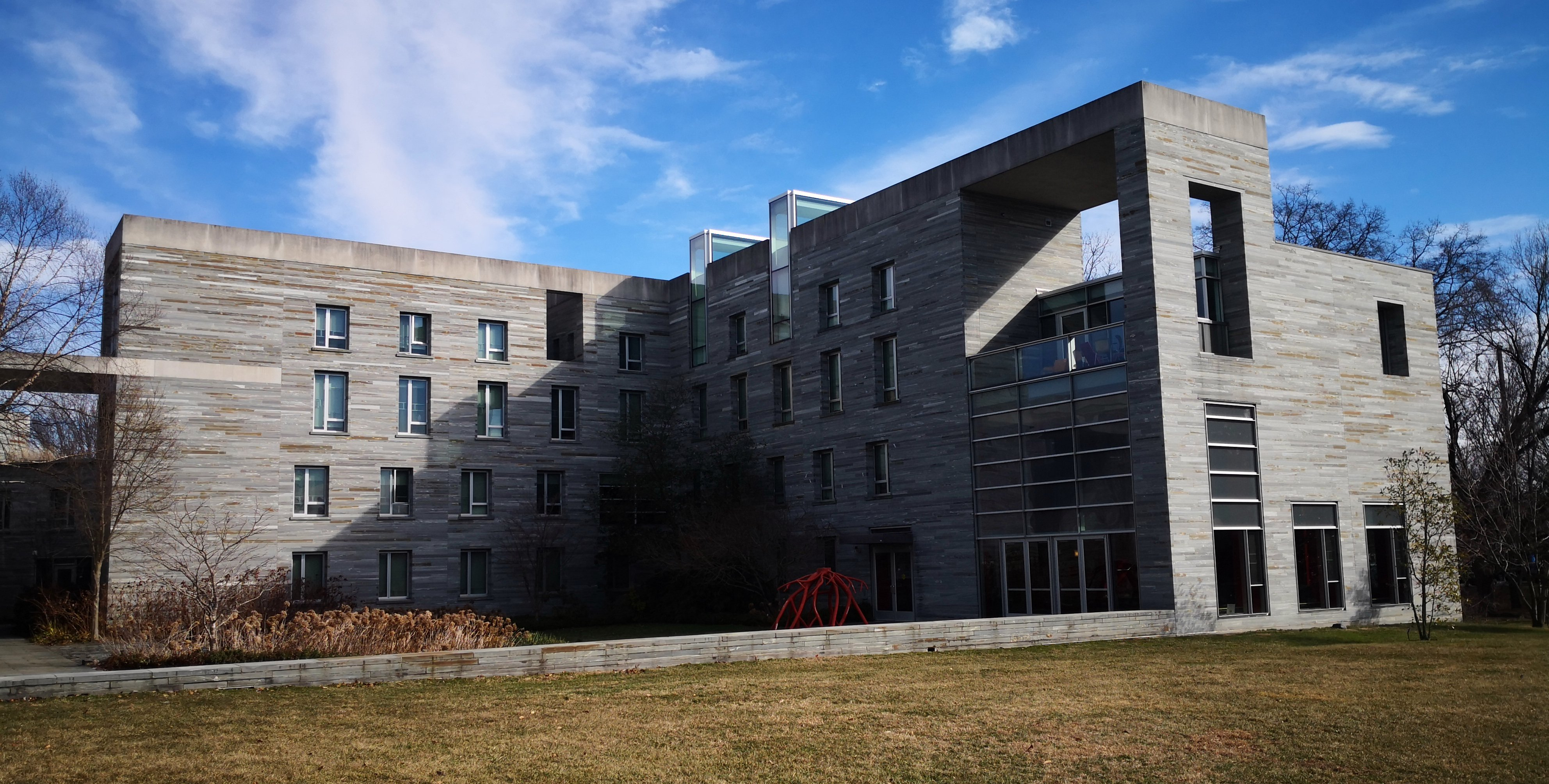
The Alice Paul Residence Hall at Swarthmore College in Swarthmore, Pennsylvania, named in Paul's honor

Paul was posthumously inducted into the National Women's Hall of Fame in 1979, and into the New Jersey Hall of Fame in 2010.

Her alma mater, Swarthmore College, named the Alice Paul Women's Center in her honor, a name in use from 1975 to the early 1990s. In 2004, Swarthmore opened the Alice Paul Residence Hall. Montclair State University in New Jersey has also named a dormitory (Alice Paul Hall) in her honor. On April 12, 2016, President Barack Obama designated Sewall-Belmont House as the Belmont–Paul Women's Equality National Monument, named for Alice Paul and Alva Belmont. The University of Pennsylvania, her doctoral alma mater, maintains the Alice Paul Center for Research on Gender, Sexuality, and Women.

Two countries have honored her by issuing a postage stamp: Great Britain in 1981 and the United States in 1995. The U.S. stamp was the $0.78 Great Americans series.

Paul appeared on a United States half-ounce $10 gold coin in 2012 as part of the First Spouse Gold Coin Series. A provision in the Presidential $1 Coin Program directs that Presidential spouses be honored. As President Chester A. Arthur was a widower, Paul is shown representing "Arthur's era". The U.S. Treasury Department announced in 2016 that an image of Paul will appear on the back of a newly designed $10 bill along with Lucretia Mott, Sojourner Truth, Susan B. Anthony, Elizabeth Cady Stanton, and the 1913 Woman Suffrage Procession that Paul initiated and organized. That plan has since stalled.

In 1987, a group of New Jersey women raised the money to purchase Paul's papers when they came up for auction so that an archive could be established. Her papers and memorabilia are now held by the Schlesinger Library at Harvard University, and the Smithsonian Institution in Washington, D.C. In 1990, the same group, now the Alice Paul Institute, purchased the brick farmhouse, Paulsdale, in Mount Laurel, New Jersey, where Paul was born. Paulsdale is a National Historic Landmark and is on the New Jersey and National Registers of Historic Places. The Alice Paul Institute keeps her legacy alive with educational exhibits about her life, accomplishments, and advocacy for gender equality.

Hilary Swank played Paul in the 2004 film Iron Jawed Angels, which portrayed the 1910s women's suffrage movement for passage of the 19th Amendment. In 2018, Alice Paul was a central character in an episode of Timeless (Season 2, Episode 7) which alludes to Paul giving an impassioned speech to President Woodrow Wilson during a march that ends in police violence upon the suffragist marchers. According to history, Paul was at the event and was arrested, but there is no evidence that she spoke to Wilson on that day. In 2022, Suffs, a musical written by Shaina Taub, premiered at The Public Theater with Alice Paul as a main character.

On January 11, 2016, a Google Doodle commemorated her 131st birthday.

== See also ==
- Iron Jawed Angels, 2004 film about Alice Paul and Lucy Burns and their movement, which resulted in the passage of the Nineteenth Amendment.
- List of civil rights leaders
- List of suffragists and suffragettes
- List of women's rights activists
- Timeline of women's suffrage
- Timeline of women's suffrage in the United States
- Women's suffrage organizations
