= J. Owen Grundy =

American journalist

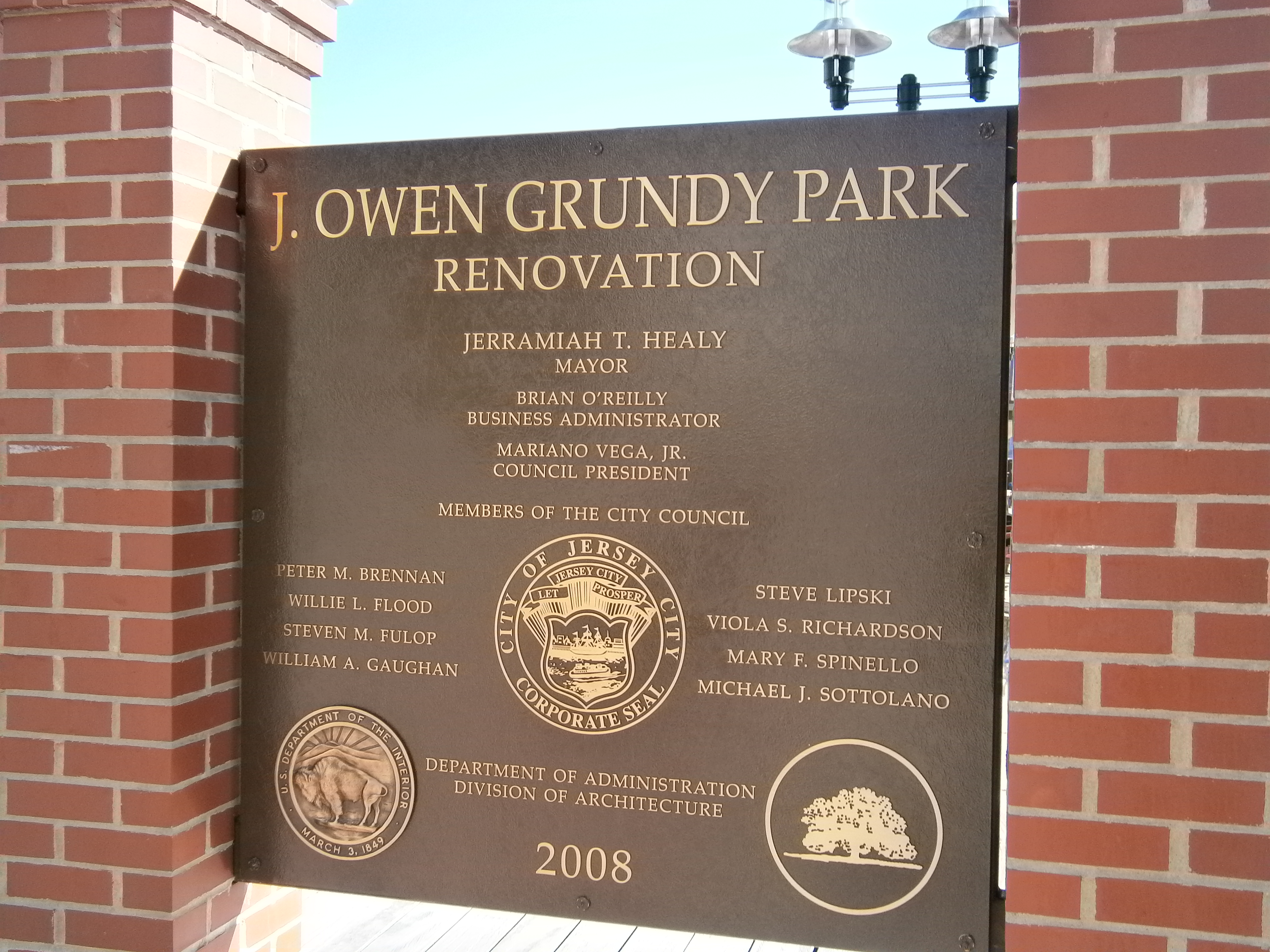
Marker at park named in Grundy's honor

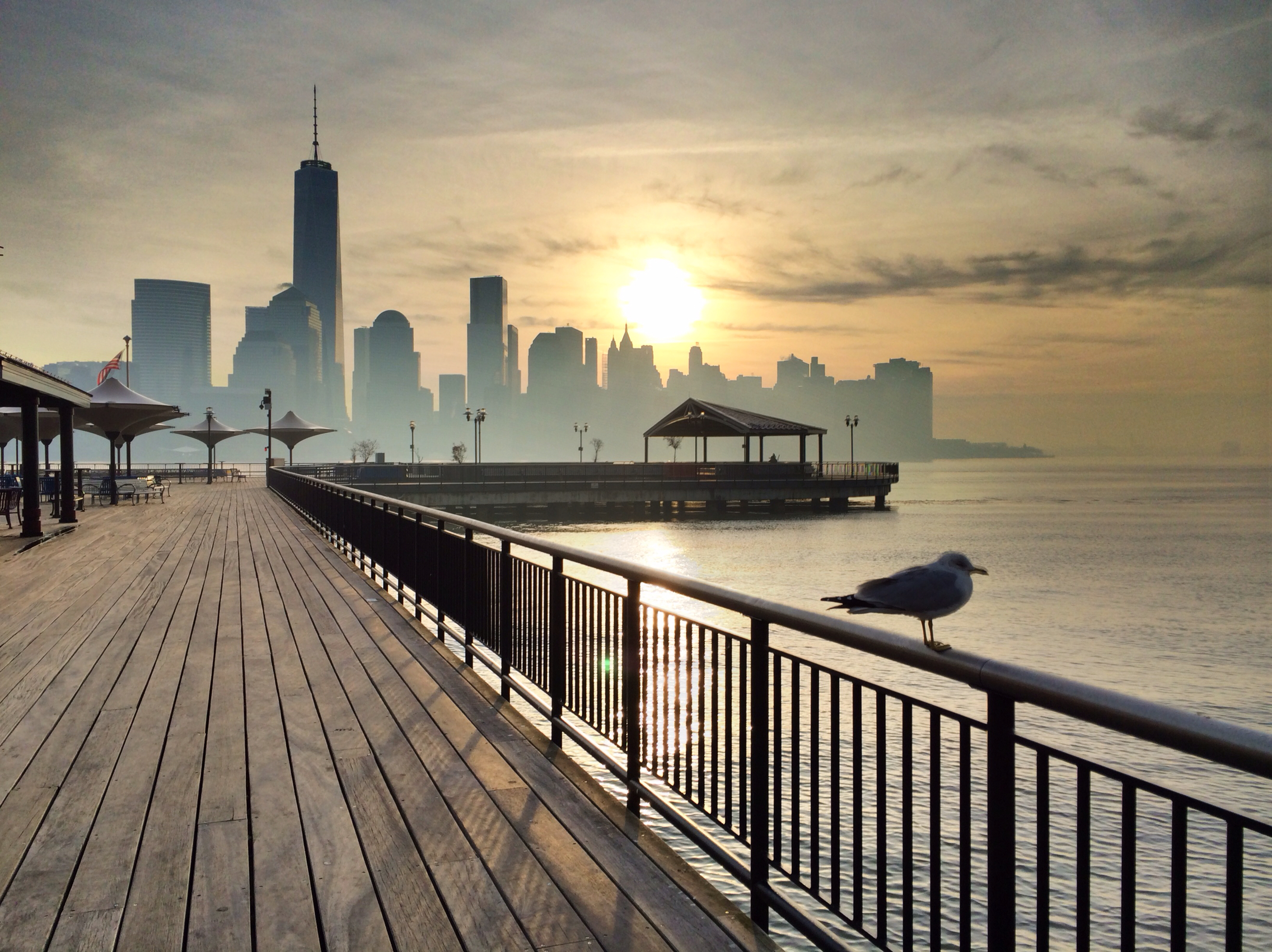
Pier in the park

J. Owen Grundy ( March 8, 1911 - January, 1985) was a native of Jersey City, New Jersey and was until his death, its official historian and chairman of the city's Municipal Historic Districts Commission. A Hudson River waterfront park at Exchange Place is named in his honor.

Grundy wrote The History of Jersey City, published in honor of the 1976 American Bicentennial and about 50 monographs on historic subjects related to Hudson County, New Jersey. He was among the founders of the Brownstone Revival Committee in Jersey City and the Preservation and Restoration Association of Jersey City and had served five terms as president of the Jersey City Museum Association.

From 1946 to 1959, Grundy was a reporter and associate editor of The Villager in Greenwich Village, where he was a leader in the preservation movement. Along with Audrey Zapp, Theodore Conrad, and Morris Pesin, Grundy was influential in the environmental and preservation movement that led to the creation of Liberty State Park.

The J. Owen Grundy Award is given annually for preservation projects in the city.
