= List of palaces =

The following is a list of palaces by country.

== Afghanistan ==
- Darul Aman Palace, Kabul – the country's most famous palace.
- Tajbeg Palace – inaccurately known as the Queen's Palace in English
- Arg Presidential Palace – Home of the president of Afghanistan
- Bagh-e Bala Palace
- Chihil Sutun
- Delgushah Palace
- Haram Sara Palace
- Shah Bobo Jan Palace
- Stor Palace
- Zarnegar Palace

== Albania ==
- Presidenca – official residential palace of the president of Albania.

== Algeria ==
- El Mouradia Palace

== Armenia ==
=== Urartu and Satrapy of Armenia ===
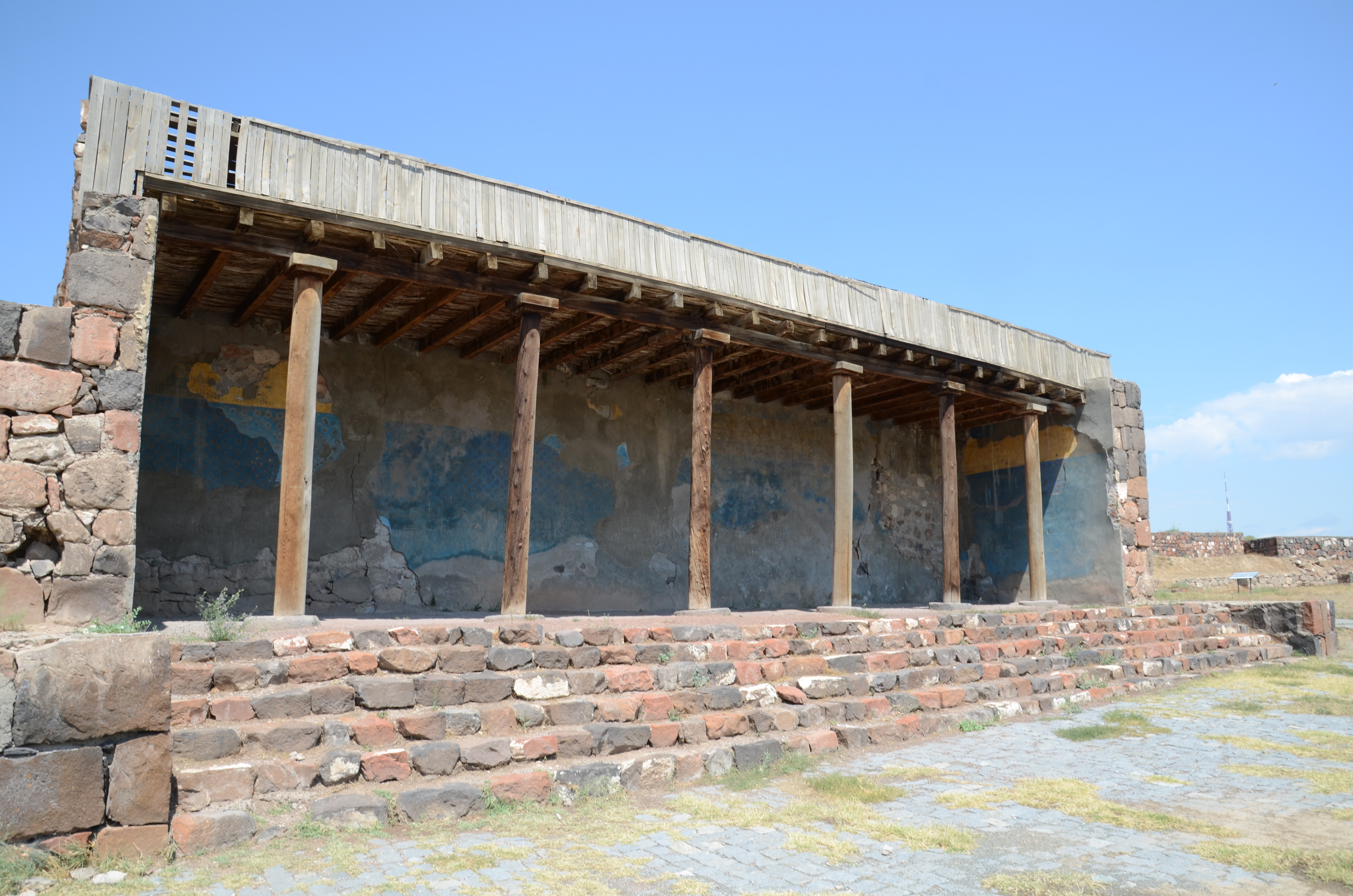
Erebuni Palace

- Erebuni Palace-Fortress
- Haykaberd
- Van Fortress

=== Kingdom of Armenia (antiquity) ===
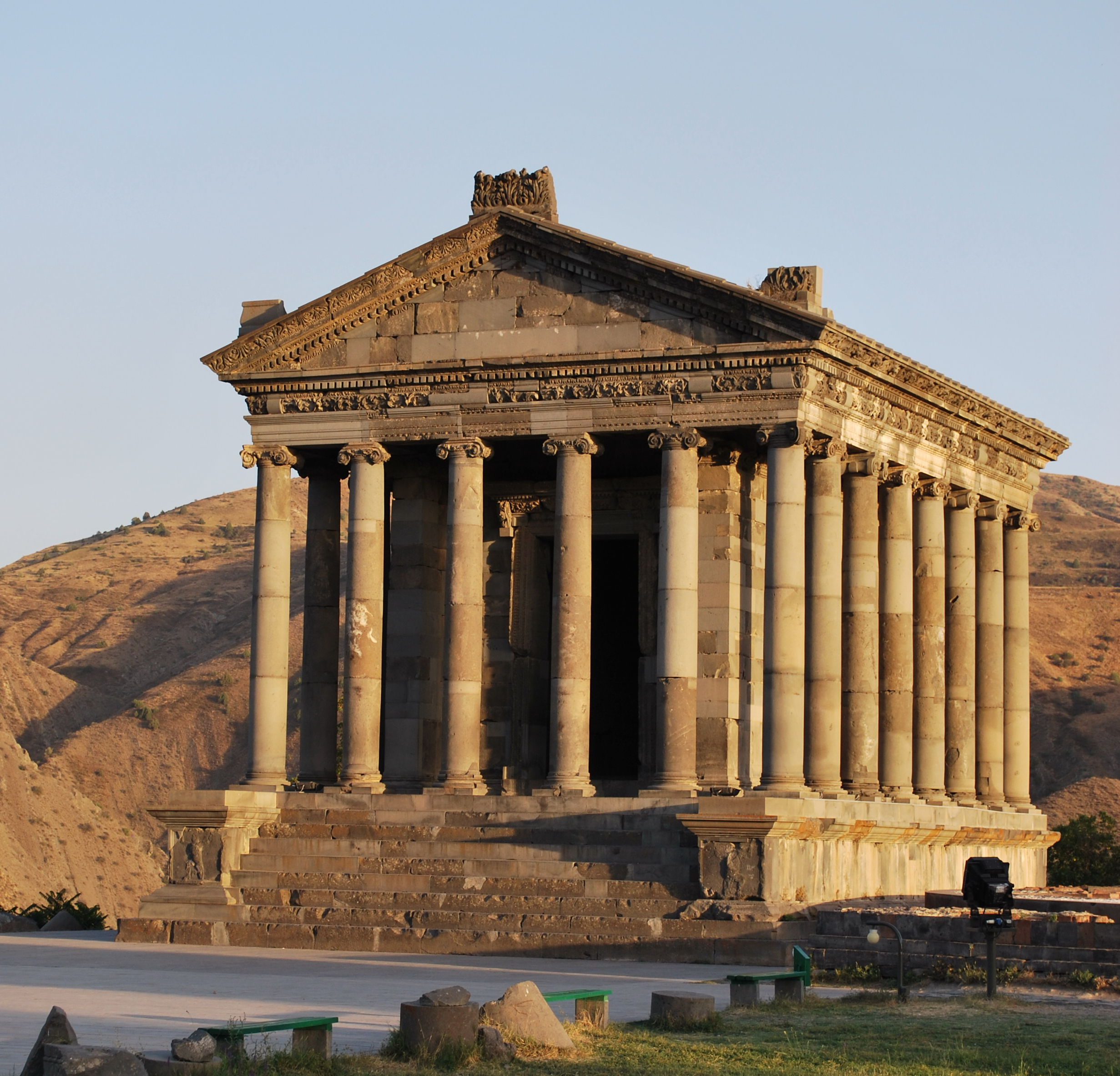
Summer Palace of Khosrovidukht

- Temple of Garni-Served as the Summer Palace of Khosrovidukht (sister of Tiridates III of Armenia)

=== Bagratid Armenia ===
- Kamsarakan Palace in Ani
- Tigran Honents (Merchants) Palace
- Dashtadem Palace
- Amberd Castle Palace

=== Armenian Kingdom of Cilicia ===
- Korikos Castle Palace
- Lampron Castle Palace-Ancestral home of the Armenian Hethumid princes.
- Levonkla Castle Palace
- Mamure Castle Palace

=== Armenian Melikdoms ===
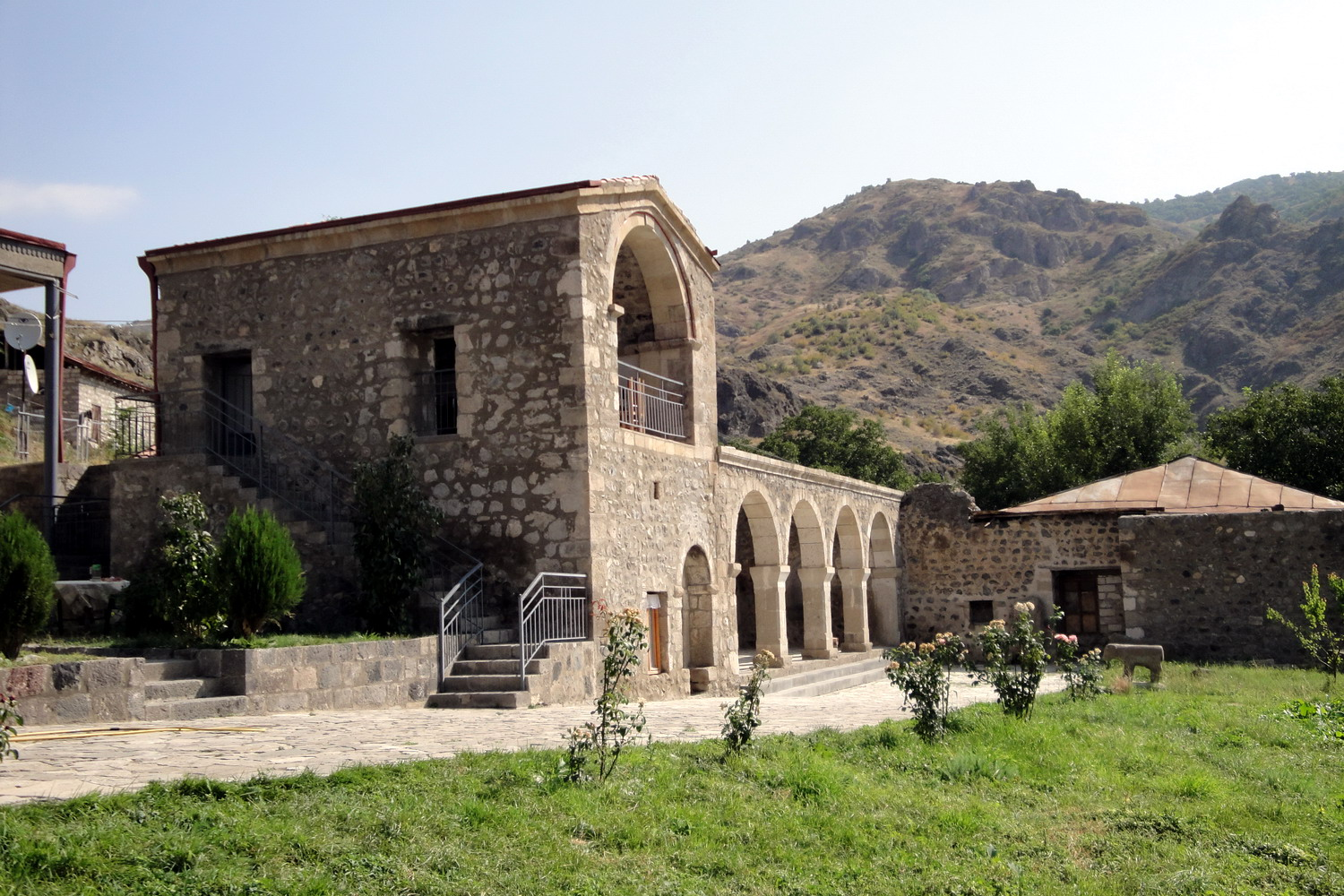
The Palace of Armenian Melik Haykazyan

- Melik Haykaz Palace (Melikashen)
- Melik Ahnazar Palace (Khnatsakh)
- Melik Kasu Palace
- Melik Yegan Palace (Togh)
- Lekh Castle Palace
- Melik-Barkhudaryan Palace (Tegh)

=== Iranian Armenia ===
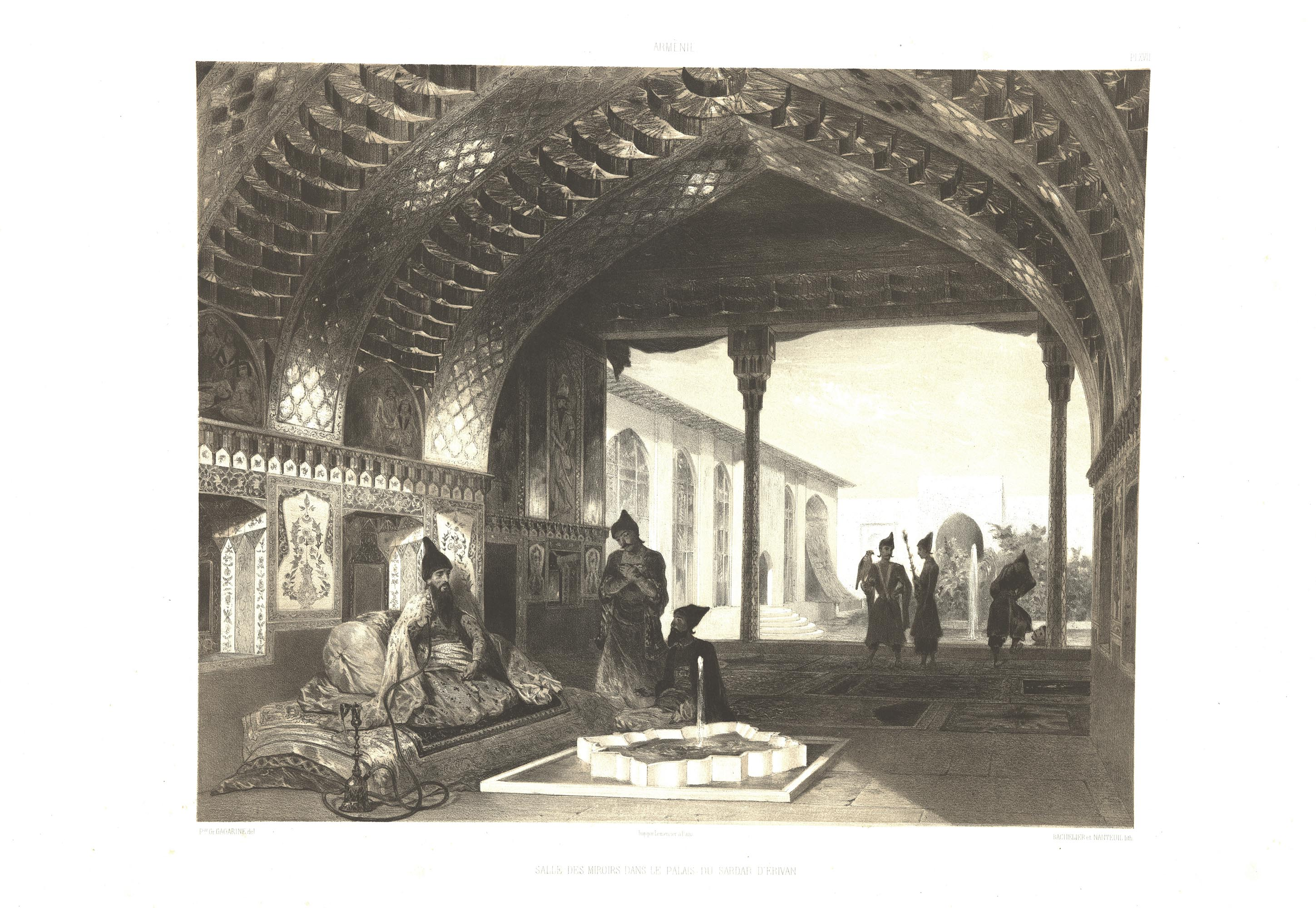
Hall of mirrors in Sardars Palace of Yerevan

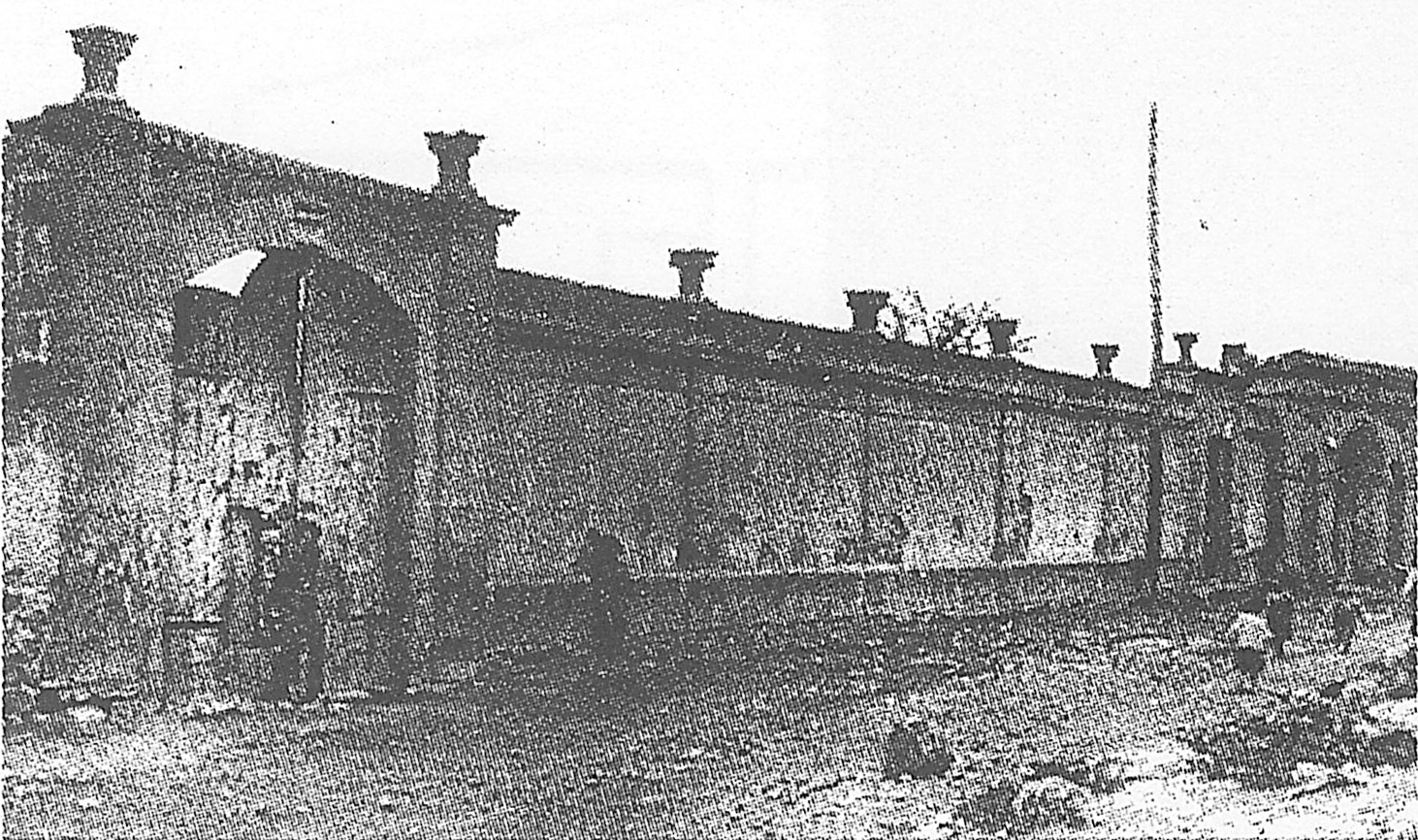
Melik-Aghamalyan's Palace in Kond

- Sardar's Palace
- Melik-Aghamalyan's Palace (Kond)
- Sardari Berd
- Pana-Khan Palace

=== Armenia ===
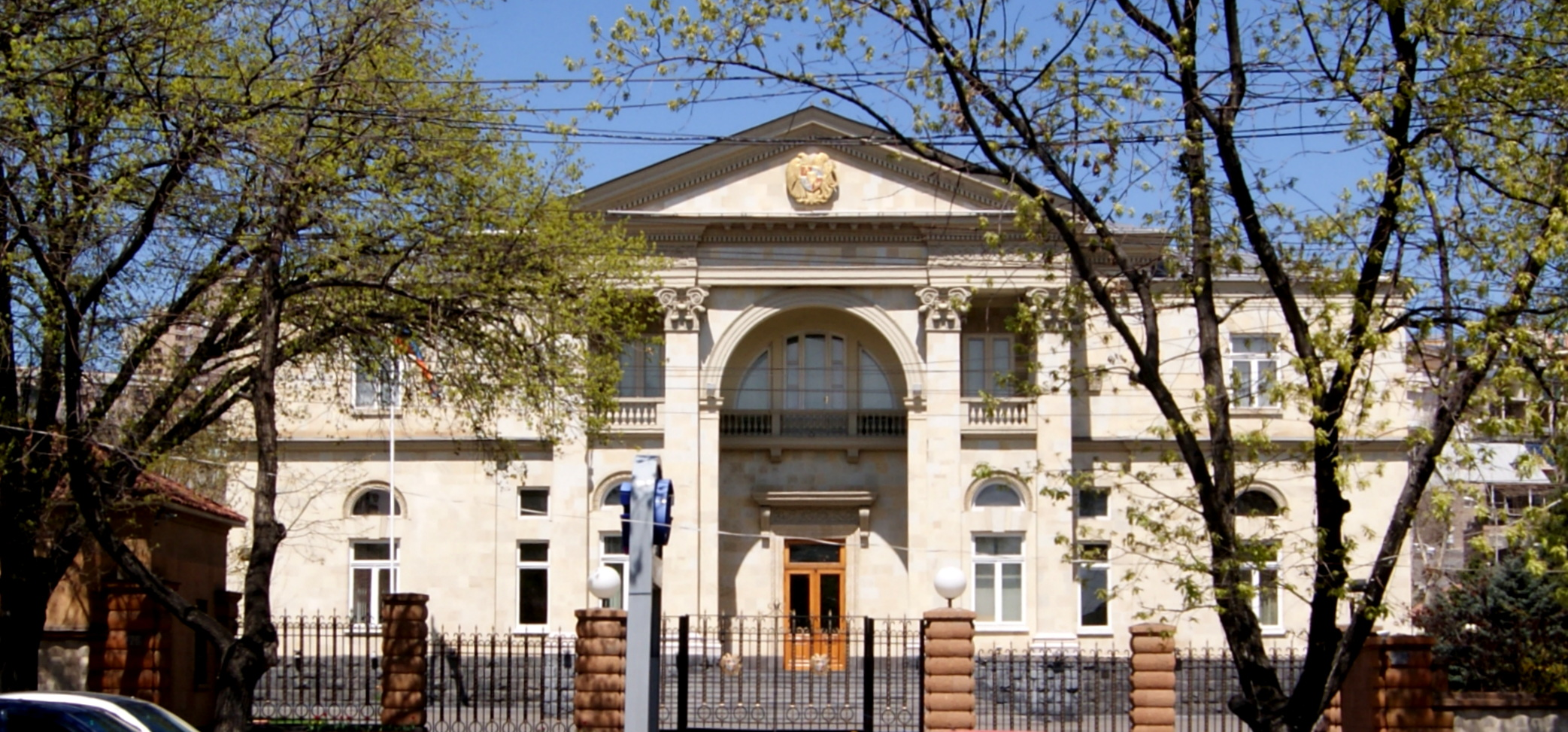
Presidential Palace in Yerevan

- Presidential Palace of Armenia-Official residence of the president of Armenia

== Australia ==
- Government House, Canberra – official residence of the King of Australia. Full-time residence of the Governor General of Australia.
- Government House, Sydney – official residence of the governor of New South Wales, the state's representative to the King of Australia.
- Government House, Adelaide – official residence of the governor of South Australia, the state's representative to the King of Australia.
- Government House, Brisbane – official residence of the governor of Queensland, the state's representative to the King of Australia.
- Government House, Melbourne – official residence of the governor of Victoria, the state's representative to the King of Australia.
- Government House, Hobart – official residence of the governor of Tasmania, the state's representative to the King of Australia.
- Government House, Perth – official residence of the governor of Western Australia, the state's representative to the King of Australia.
- Government House, Darwin – official residence of the administrator of the Northern Territory, the territories representative to the King of Australia.
- Admiralty House – official Sydney residence of the governor general of Australia.
- The Lodge – official residence of the prime minister of Australia
- Kirribilli House – official Sydney residence of the prime minister of Australia.

== Austria ==
- Schloss Ambras, Innsbruck – residence of Archduke Ferdinand II, from 1563 to 1595
- Alte Residenz, Salzburg – former palace of the Prince-Archbishops of Salzburg
- Belvedere Palace – former summer residence of Prince Eugene of Savoy, Vienna
- Hofburg Palace – seat of Federal President, formerly the Imperial residence, Vienna
- Schönbrunn Palace – former imperial summer residence of the Habsburg Monarchs, Vienna
- For city palaces in Vienna (Palais), see Category:Palaces in Vienna

== Bangladesh ==
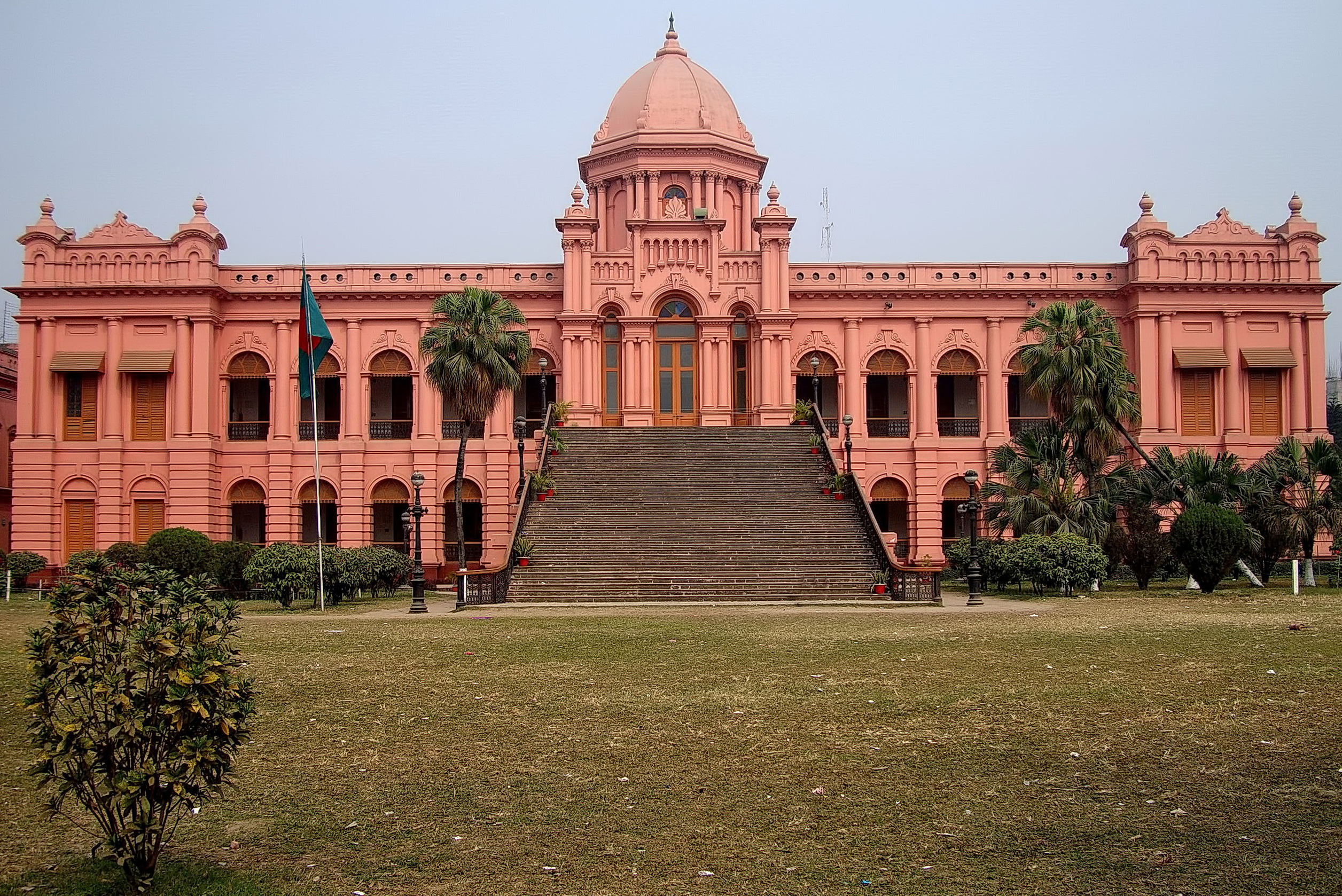
Ahsan Manzil in Dhaka

- Ahsan Manzil – former residence of the Nawab of Dhaka
- Bangabhaban – official residence of the president of Bangladesh, former viceregal house in Dhaka
- Bhawal Rajbari, Gazipur, Bangladesh
- Ghughu-danga Zamindar Bari, Dinajpur, Bangladesh
- Moyez Manzil, Faridpur, Bangladesh
- Rani Bhabani's Palace
- Tajhat Palace, Rangpur
- Lalbagh Fort, Dhaka, Bangladesh
- Rose Garden Palace, Dhaka, Bangladesh
- Natore Rajbari, Natore, Bangladesh
- Ruins of Sonargaon Palace, Dhaka, Bangladesh
- Jinjira Palace, Zinzira, Keraniganj, Bangladesh
- Dhanbari Palace, Tangail, Bangladesh
- Baliati Palace, Manikganj, Bangladesh
- Dighapatia Palace, Natore, Bangladesh
- Puthia Rajbari, Rajshahi, Bangladesh
- Shoshi Lodge, Mymensingh

== Belarus ==
- Chreptowicz Palace in Grodno
- Halshany Castle (ruined)
- Mir Castle
- New Hrodna Castle
- Niasviž Castle
- Old Grodno Castle
- Palace in Dziedzina
- Palace in Hermanowicze
- Palace in Kosava
- Palace in Postawy
- Palace in Świack
- Pruzhany Palace
- Rumyantsev-Paskevich Residence
- Ruzhany Palace (ruined)
- Stanislawowka Palace in Grodno
- Wańkowicz Palace in Minsk

== Belgium ==
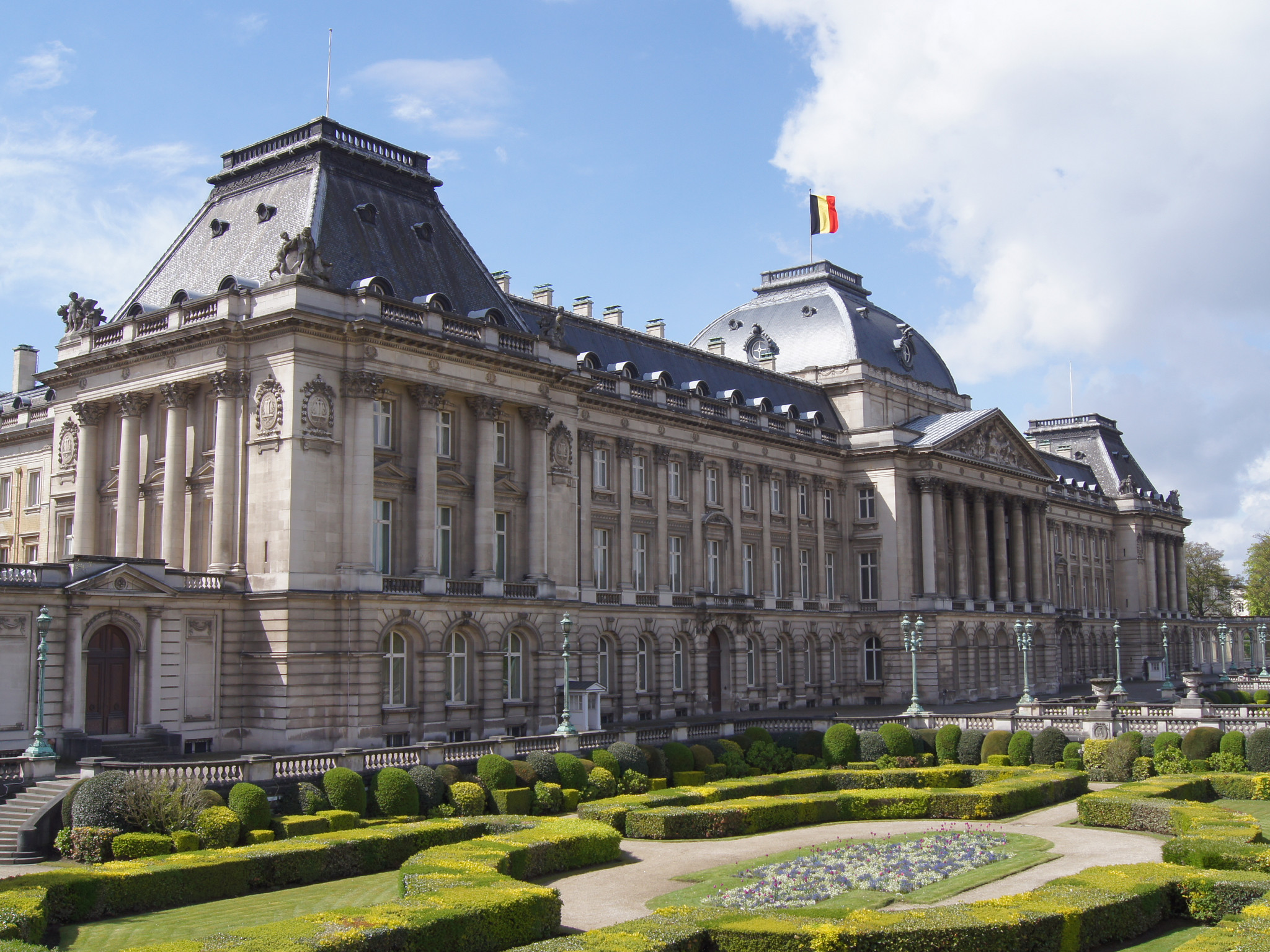
The Royal Palace of Brussels

=== Brussels ===
- Academy Palace
- Egmont Palace
- Palace of Charles of Lorraine
- Palace of the Count of Flanders
- Royal Castle of Laeken and Royal Greenhouses of Laeken
- Royal Palace of Brussels
- Stoclet Palace

=== Elsewhere ===
- Royal Palace of Antwerp (Antwerp)
- Prince-Bishops' Palace (Liège)

== Benin ==
- Royal Palaces of Abomey – seat of the Kings of Abomey

== Bhutan ==
- Lingkana Palace – royal residence of the King of Bhutan

== Bolivia ==
- Palacio Quemado, La Paz

== Brazil ==
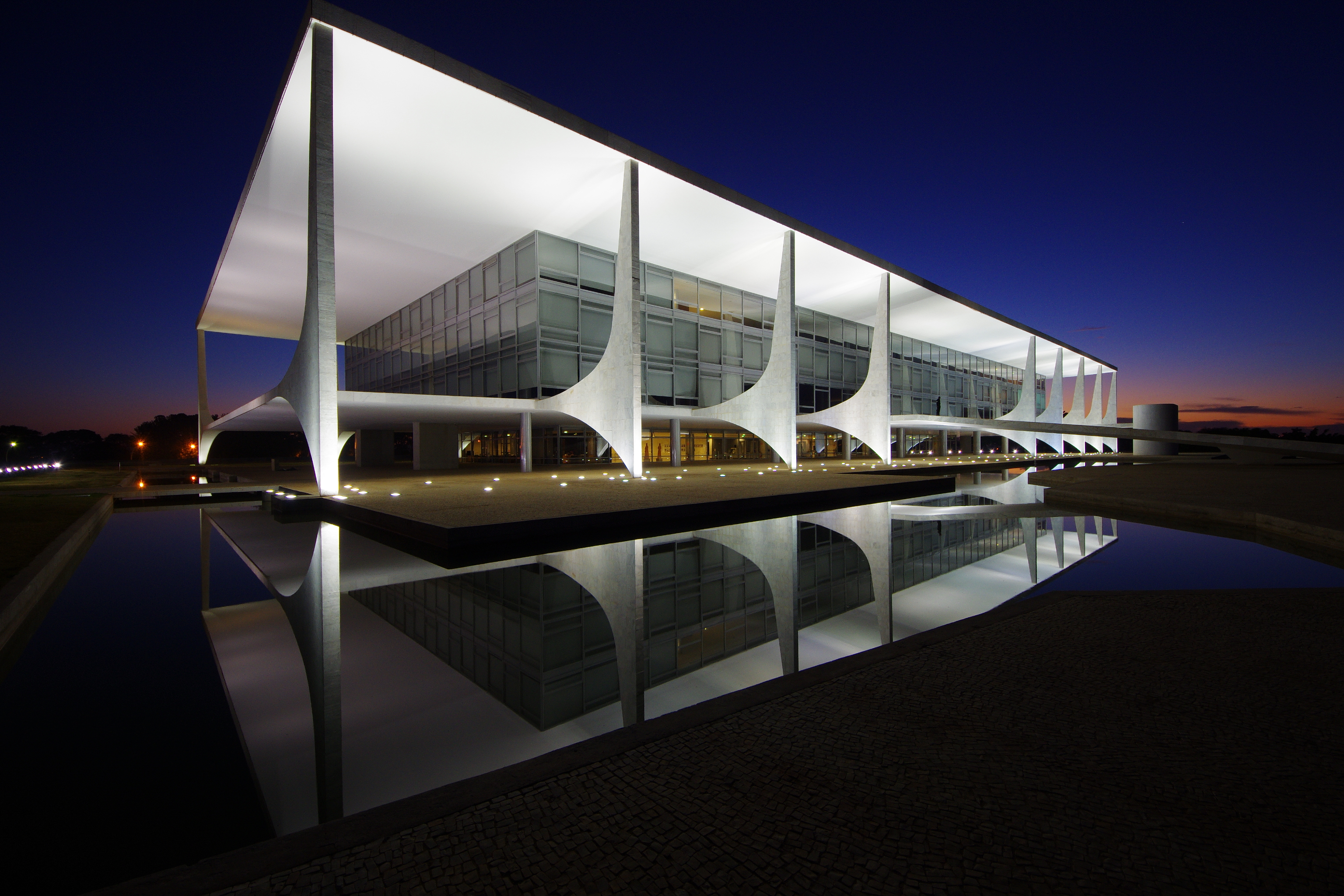
Palácio do Planalto, Brasília

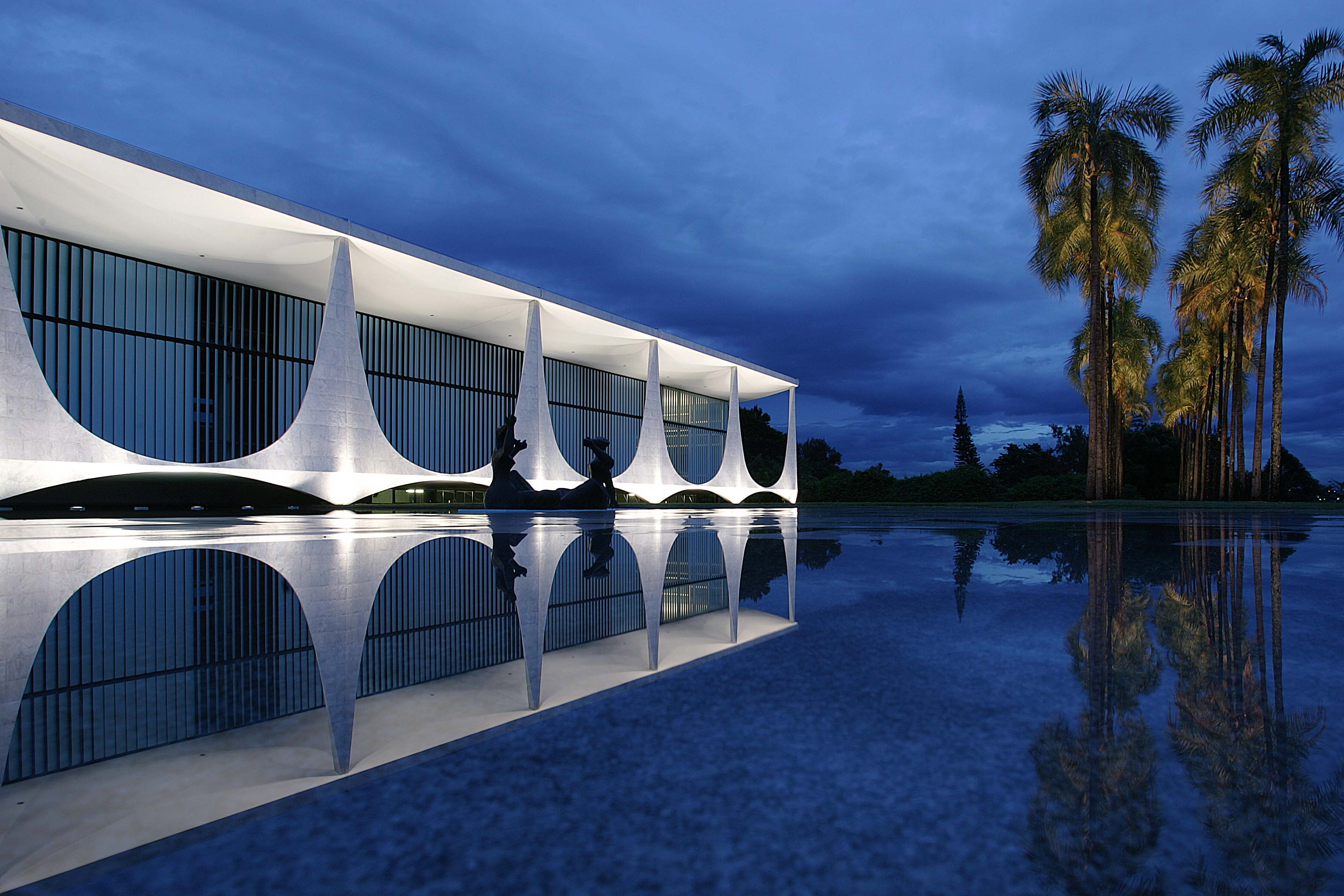
Palácio da Alvorada, Brasília

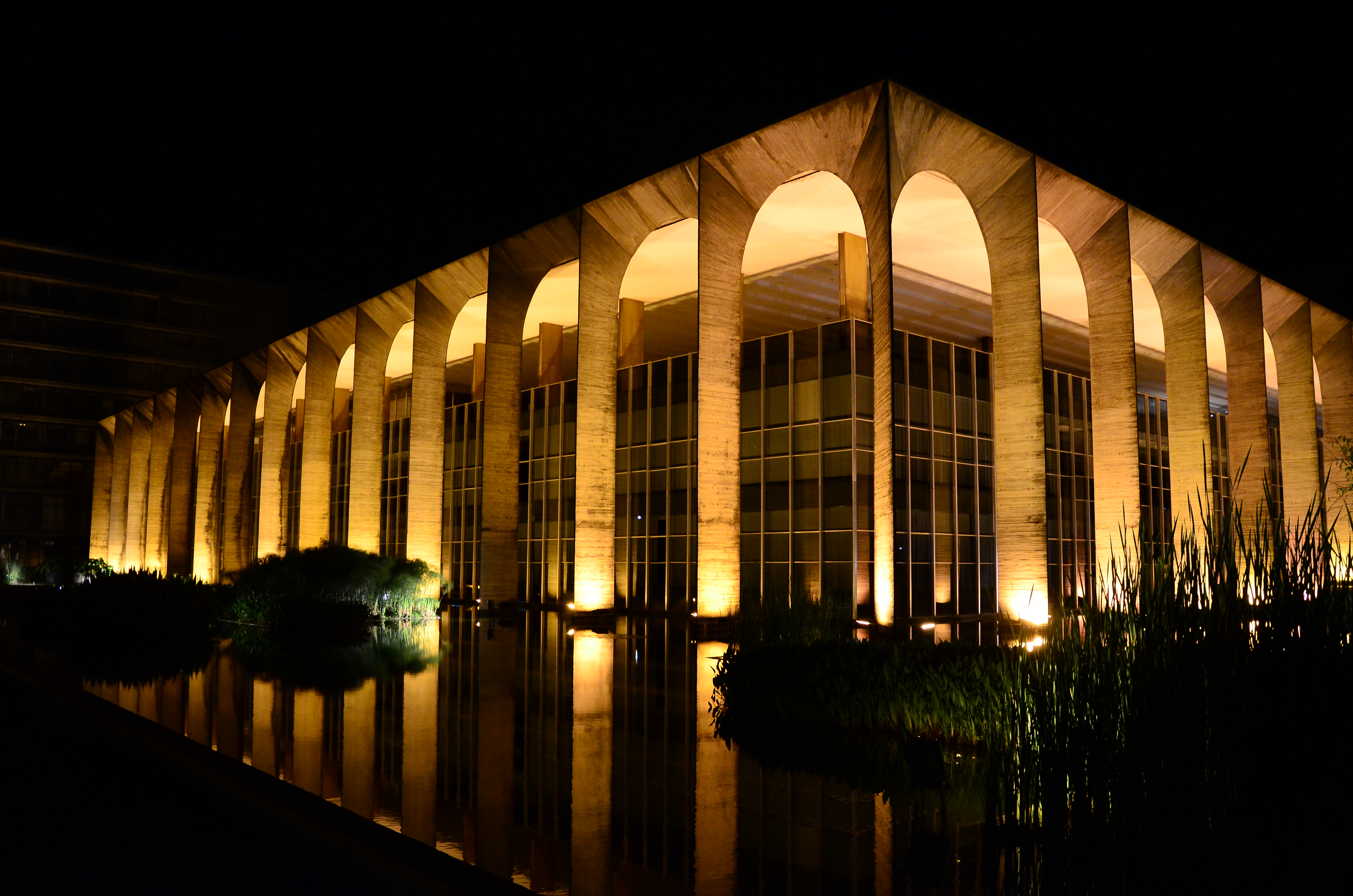
Itamaraty Palace, Brasília

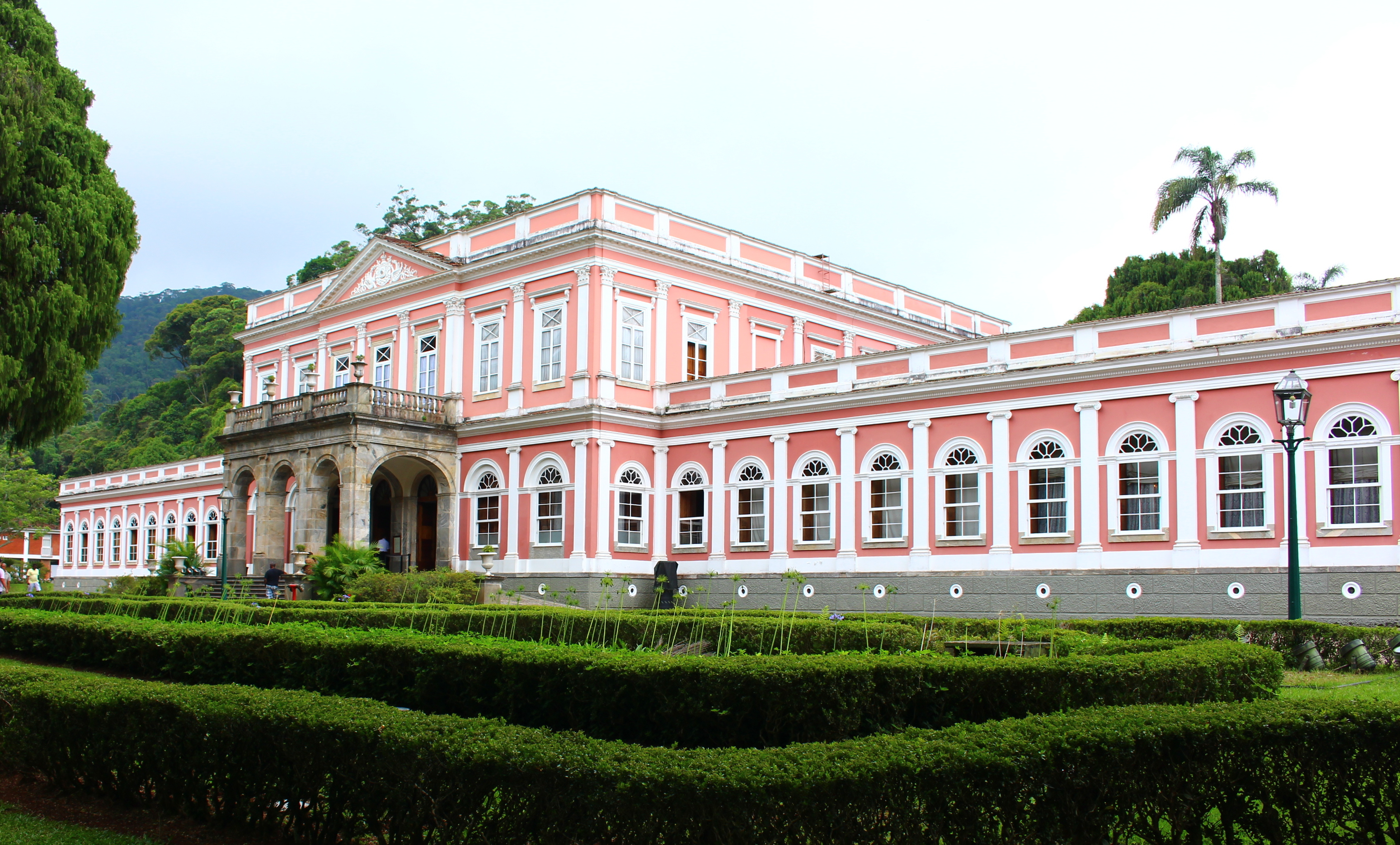
Palace of Petrópolis, Petrópolis

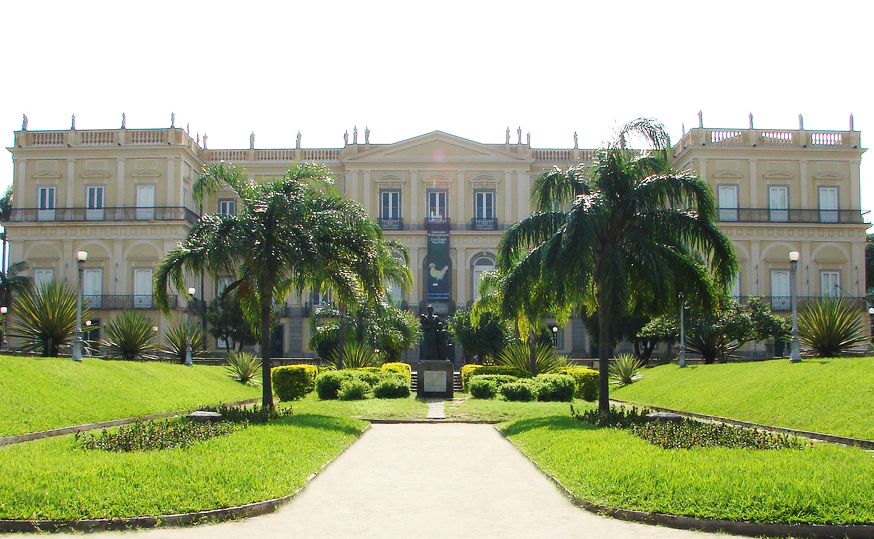
Palace of São Cristóvão, Rio de Janeiro

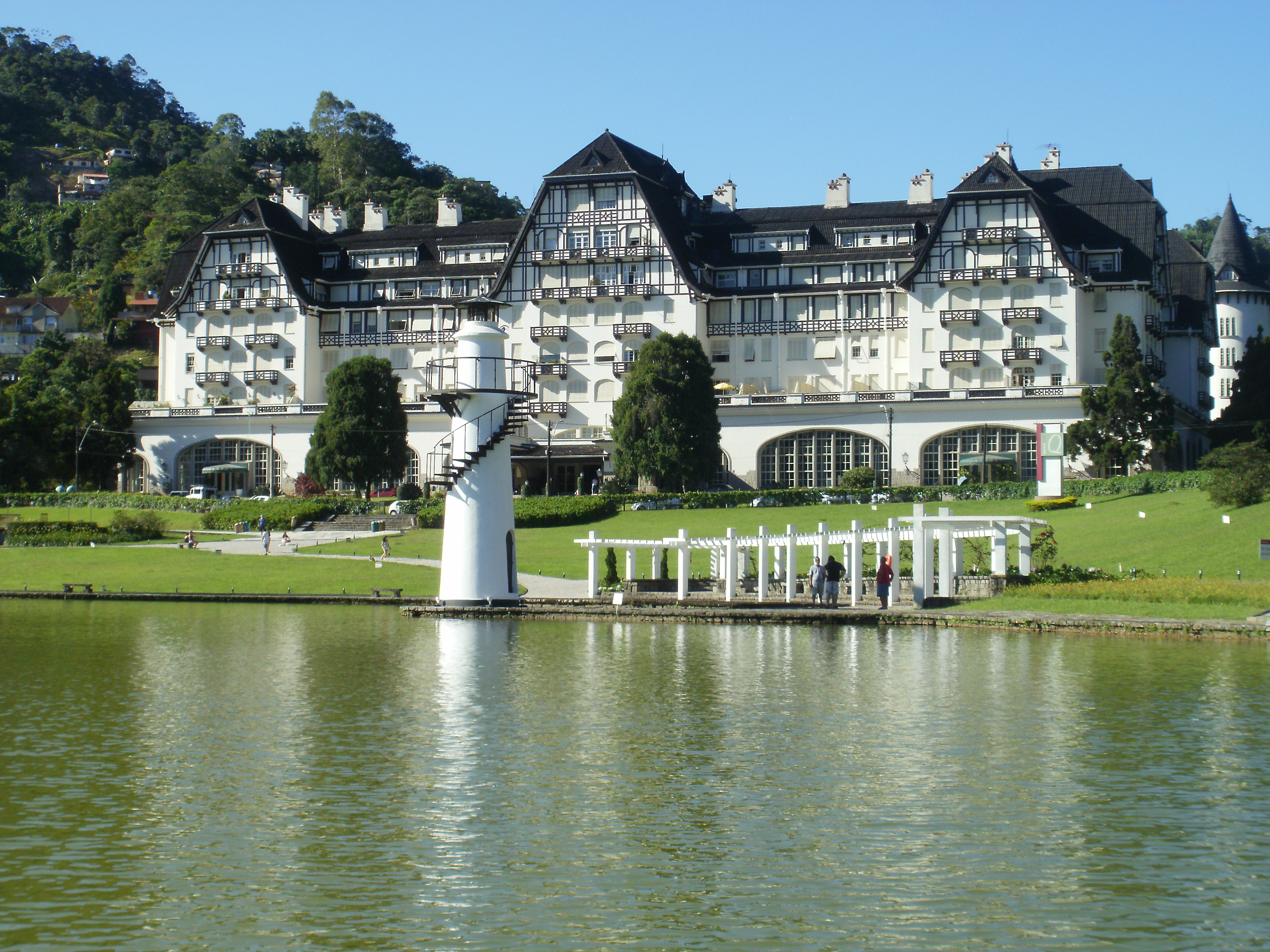
Quitandinha Palace, Petrópolis

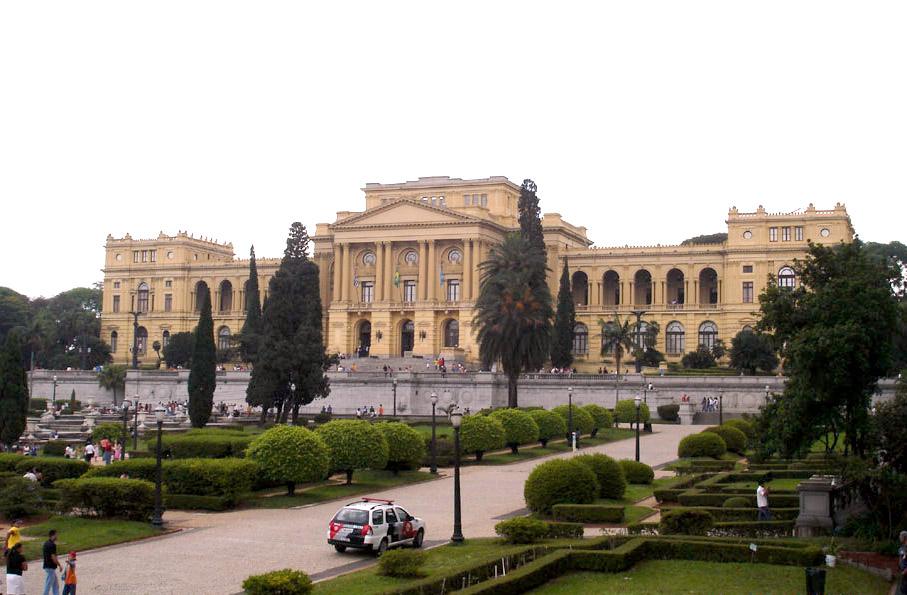
Ipiranga Palace, São Paulo

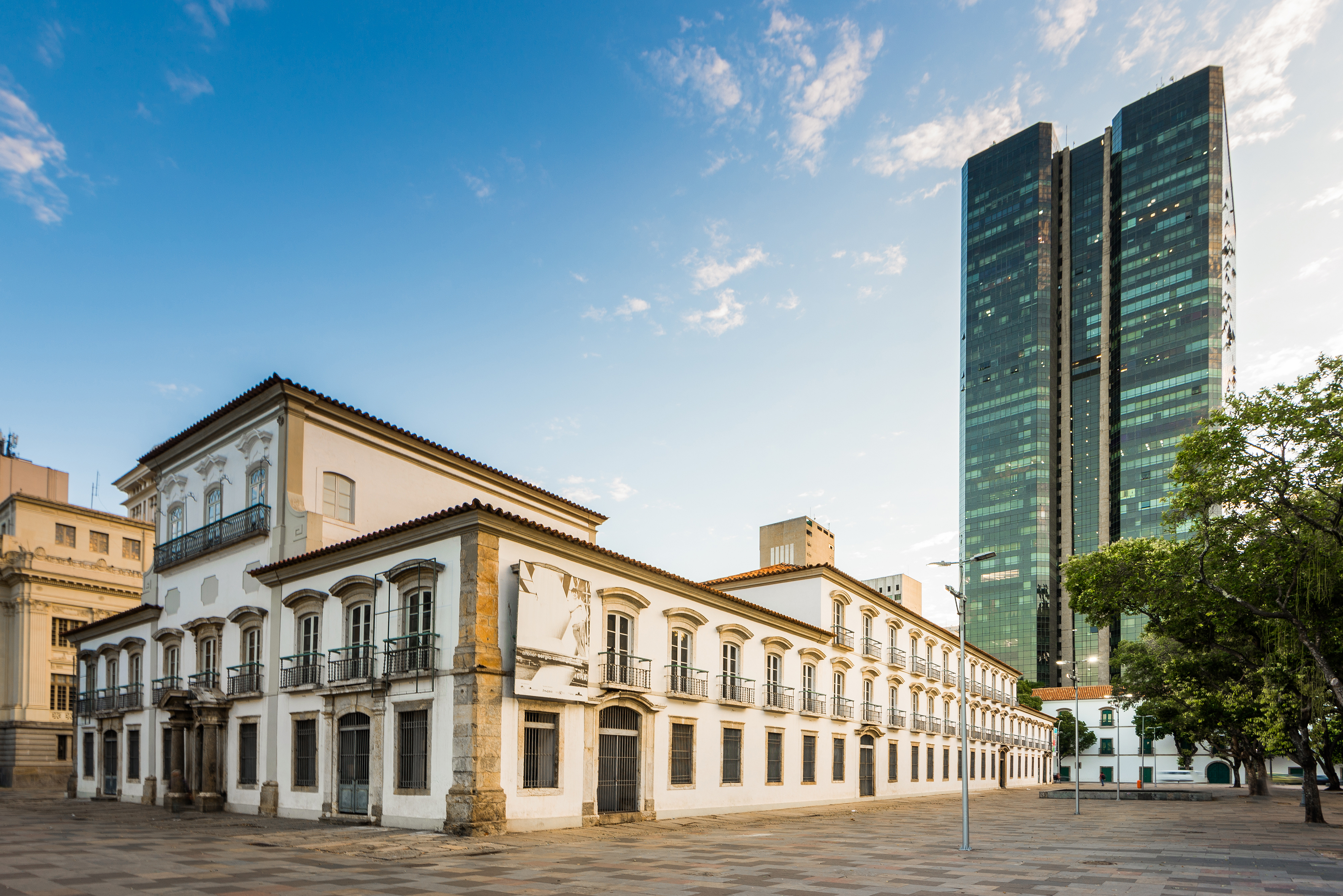
Paço Imperial, Rio de Janeiro

- Paço Imperial
- Palácio Antônio Lemos
- Palácio Anchieta
- Palácio Araribóia
- Palácio Araguaia
- Palácio Arquiepiscopal
- Palácio Brocoió
- Palácio do Campo das Princesas
- Palácio da Aclamação
- Palácio da Alvorada – Presidential residence in Brasília
- Palácio da Conceição
- Palácio da Concórdia
- Palácio da Fonte Grande
- Palácio da Justiça
- Palácio da Liberdade
- Palácio da Vitória
- Palácio das Artes
- Palácio das Indústrias
- Palácio das Princesas
- Palácio de Brocoió
- Palácio de Cristal
- Palácio de Ondina
- Palácio de São Cristóvão
- Palácio do Anhangabaú
- Palácio do Buriti
- Catete Palace – former presidential residence
- Palácio do Conde dos Arcos
- Palácio do Itamaraty – Rio de Janeiro – former Ministry of External Relations
- Palácio do Itamaraty – Ministry of External Relations
- Palácio do Congresso Nacional – National Congress and House of representatives
- Palácio do Lavradio
- Palácio do Jaburu
- Palácio do Paranaguá
- Palácio do Planalto – Presidential office in Brasília
- Palácio dos Bandeirantes
- Palácio dos Leões
- Palácio dos Martírios
- Palácio Farroupilha
- Palácio Grão Pará
- Guanabara Palace
- Palácio Gustavo Capanema
- Palácio Iguaçu
- Palácio Imperial – Imperial Museum of Brazil
- Palácio Karnak
- Palácio Laranjeiras
- Lauro Sodré Palace
- Palácio Monroe
- Palácio Piratini
- Palácio Quitandinha
- Palácio Rio Branco – Acre
- Palácio Rio Branco – Bahia
- Palácio Rio Negro – Presidential retreat in Petrópolis
- Palácio São Joaquim
- Palácio Teresa Cristina
- Tiradentes Palace

== Brunei ==
- Istana Darussalam – former official residence of the Sultan of Brunei.
- Istana Darul Hana – former official residence of the Sultan of Brunei.
- Istana Pantai – former official residence of the Sultan of Brunei.
- Istana Mahkota – former official residence of the Sultan of Brunei.
- Istana Majalis – former official residence of the Sultan of Brunei.
- Istana Kaca – former official residence of the Sultan of Brunei.
- Istana Kota Manggalela – residence of the Sultan of Brunei in the Belait district.
- Istana Nurul Iman – residence of the Sultan of Brunei and world's largest residential palace.
- Istana Nurul Izzah – residence of the Sultan of Brunei.
- Istana Edinburgh – residence of the Sultan of Brunei and the state guesthouse of the government.

== Bulgaria ==
=== Varna and Black Sea coast ===
- Euxinograd – former royal summer residence located on the Black Sea coast, in the outskirts of Varna. The palace is currently a governmental and presidential retreat hosting cabinet meetings in the summer and offering access for tourists to several villas and hotels as well as the gardens.

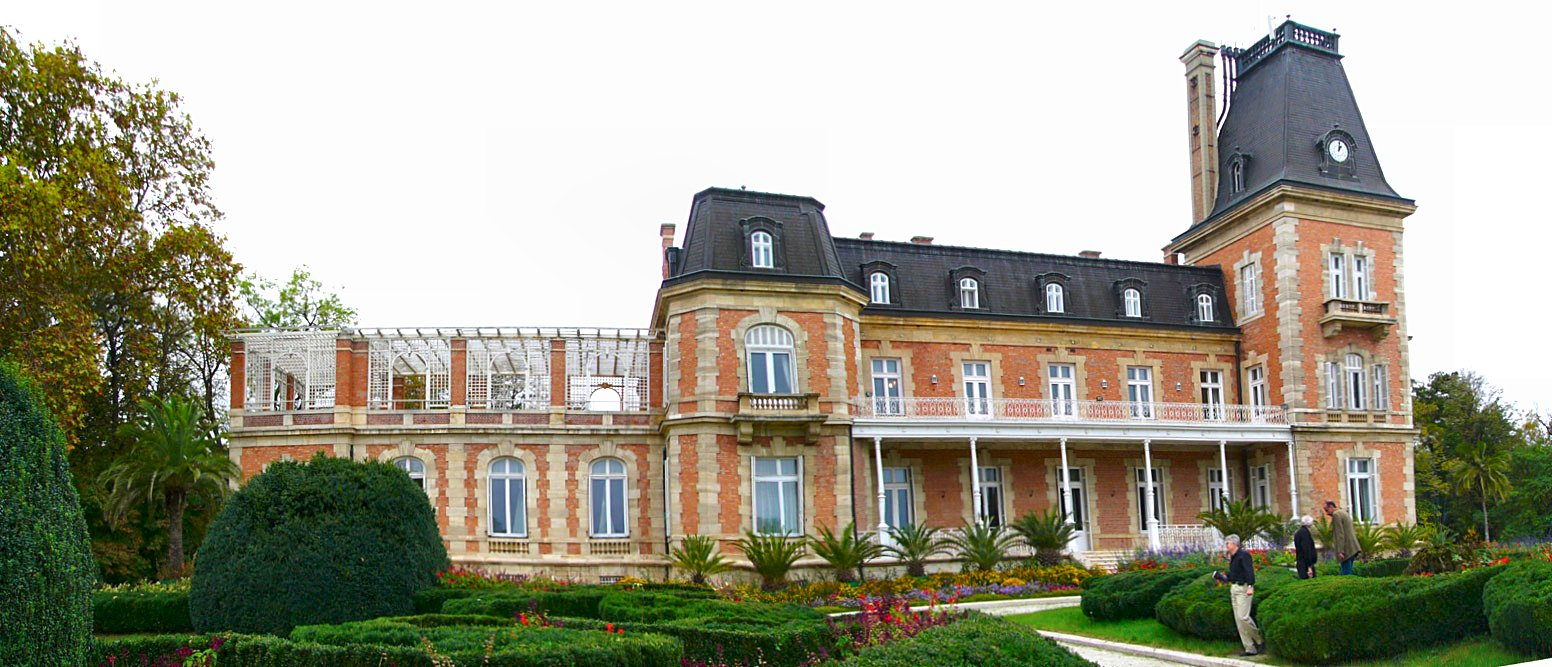
Euxinograd Palace, Varna.

- Balchik Palace – a palace in the Bulgarian Black Sea town and resort of Balchik in Southern Dobruja. It was constructed between 1926 and 1937, during the Romanian control of the region, for the needs of Queen Marie of Romania. It's a popular tourist attraction in the region and most known for its botanical gardens.

=== Ruse ===
- Battenberg Palace, former royal palace built for knyaz Alexander of Battenberg. Today, it houses the Regional Historic Museum of Ruse.

=== Sofia ===
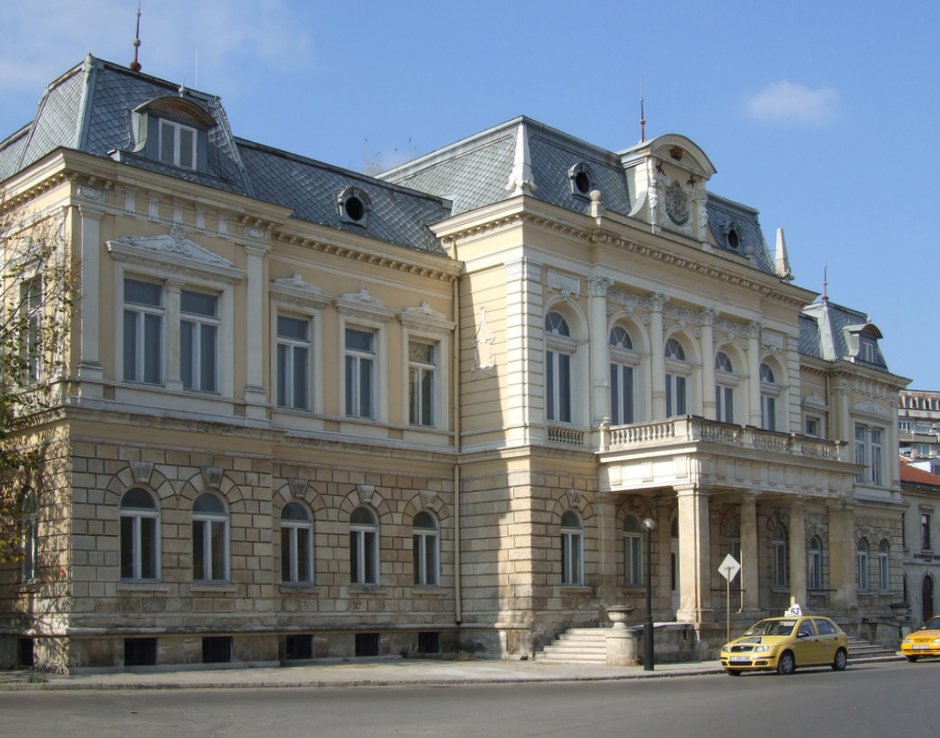
Battenberg Palace, Ruse.

- The former Royal Palace in Sofia, today accommodating the National Art Gallery and National Ethnographic Museum. The palace was built during the rule of Alexander of Battenberg. It was later expanded and used by Ferdinand I as his official residence. During the rule of Boris III, it served mainly for representative purposes, as the official residence of the Royal Family was in Vrana.
- Vrana Palace – former official residence of the Bulgarian Royal Family in the outskirts of Sofia. Today, it's the official residence of former Tsar Simeon II of Bulgaria and Tsaritsa Margarita. The palace gardens are open for the general public on the weekends.
- Boyana – serves as the official residence of the Bulgarian President, Vice President and Prime Minister. The former palace, which served as the primary residence for Bulgarian communist leader Todor Zhivkov, now houses the National Historical Museum of Bulgaria.
- Sarmadzhiev House – located in central Sofia, it serves as the official residence of the Turkish Ambassador to Bulgaria.
- British House – a palace in the centre of Sofia, serves as the official residence for the British Ambassador to Bulgaria. It was used by Prince Charles during his visits in 1998 and in 2003.
- Kuyumdzhiev House – built for the prominent Bulgarian businessman Angel Kuyumdzhiev, it serves as the official residence of the French Ambassador to Bulgaria.
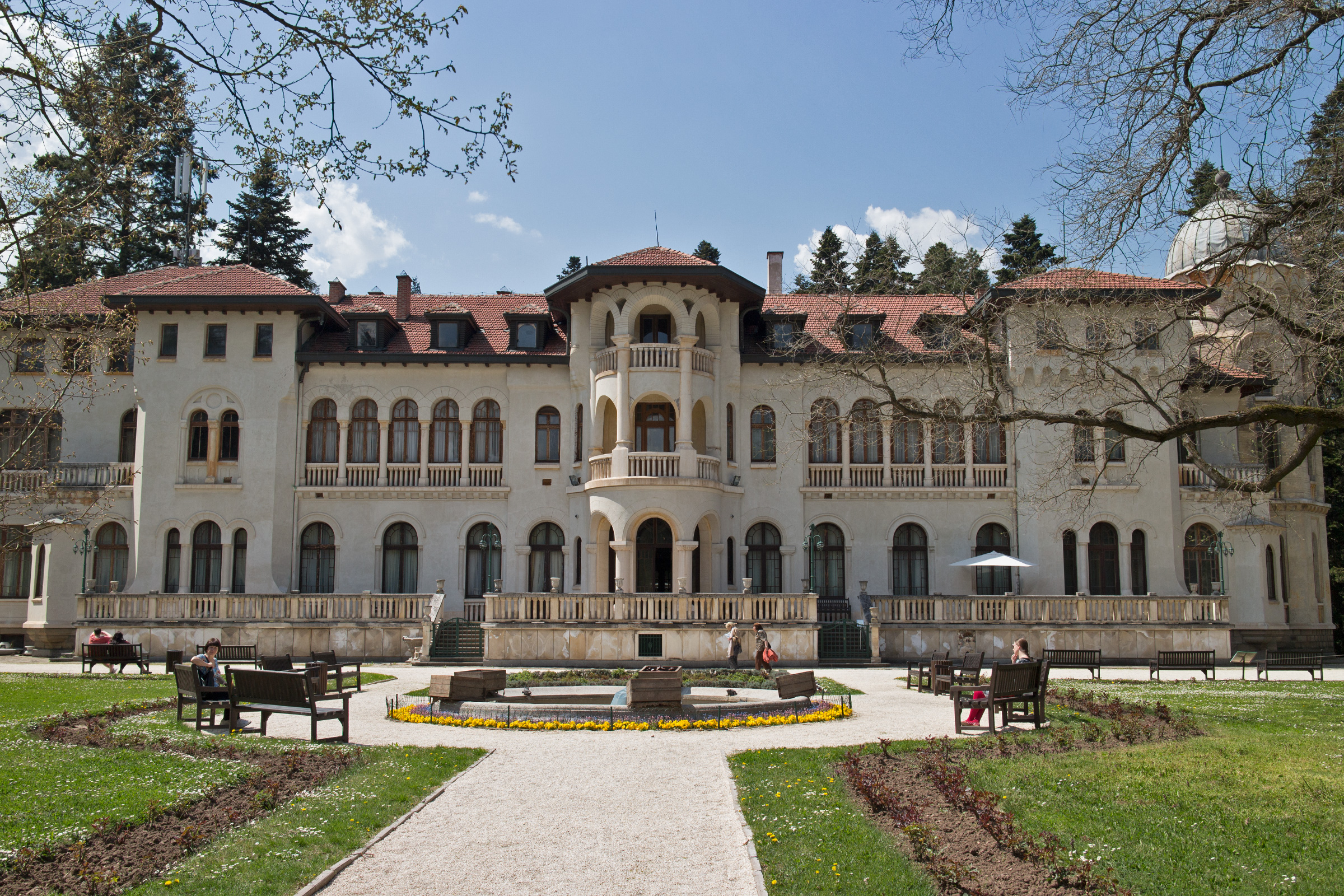
  Vrana Palace, in the outskirts of Sofia.

=== Other Historic Palaces ===
The following are historic strongholds throughout the years in the different capitals of Bulgaria. They often housed the royal and patriarchal palaces and are enclosed in defensive walls around their perimeter.

- Tsarevets Fortress – royal stronghold that houses the royal and patriarchal palaces of the Second Bulgarian Empire (1185–1393).
- Belogradchik Fortress – ancient fortress constructed during the time the region was part of the Roman Empire.
- Asen's Fortress – medieval fortress in the Bulgarian Rhodope Mountains.
- Baba Vida Fortress – medieval fortress in Vidin in northwestern Bulgaria. It briefly served as the capital of the Second Bulgarian Empire before it was seized by the Ottoman Empire in 1396.
- Palace of Omurtag – site of the former royal palace of Omurtag of Bulgaria, ruler (kanasubigi) of the First Bulgarian Empire (815–831) in northeastern Bulgaria.
- Urvich – a medieval fortress in present-day Pancharevo, about 20 km from Sofia, built during the Second Bulgarian Empire by Emperor Ivan Shishman of Bulgaria.

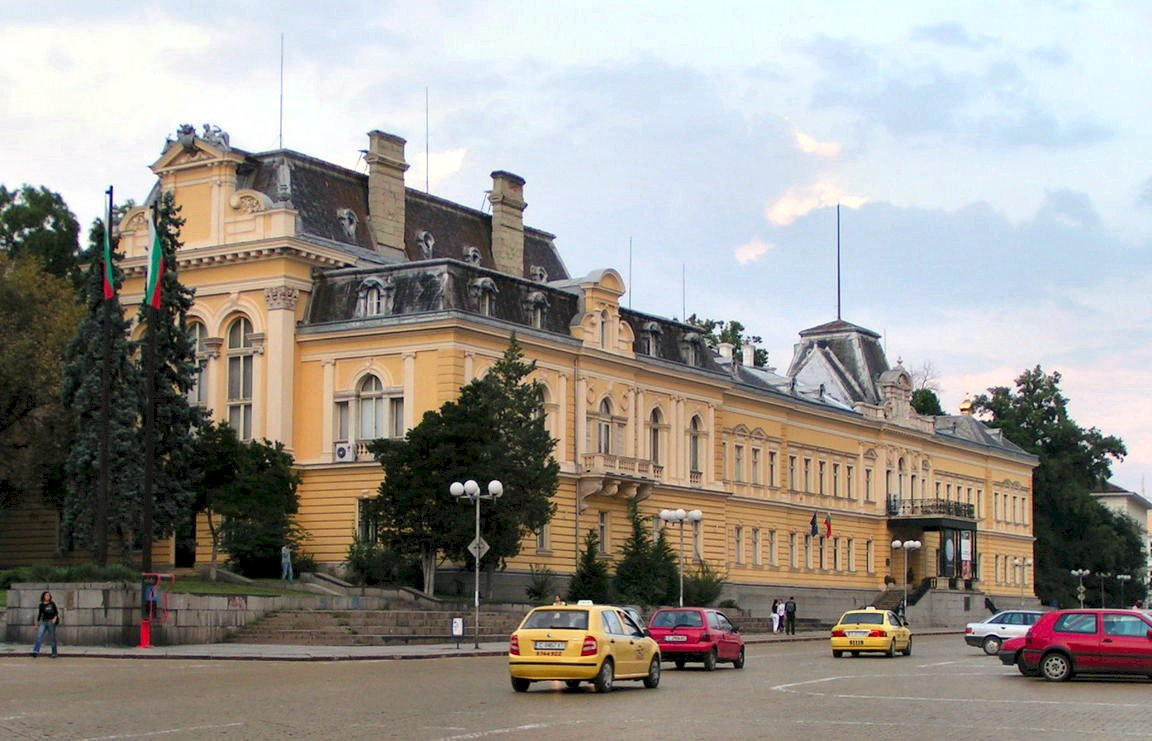
Royal Palace of Sofia, now houses the National Art Gallery.

=== Other Royal Palaces ===
These are mostly hunting lodges and retreats for the Bulgarian Royal Family, located in the Rila Mountain range.

- Tsarska Bistritsa – a former royal palace in the Rila Mountain range.
- Saragyol – a royal residence in the Rila Mountains.
- Sitnyakovo – a royal residence in the Rila Mountains.

== Burundi ==
- Ibwami – former royal palace, Gitega

== Cambodia ==
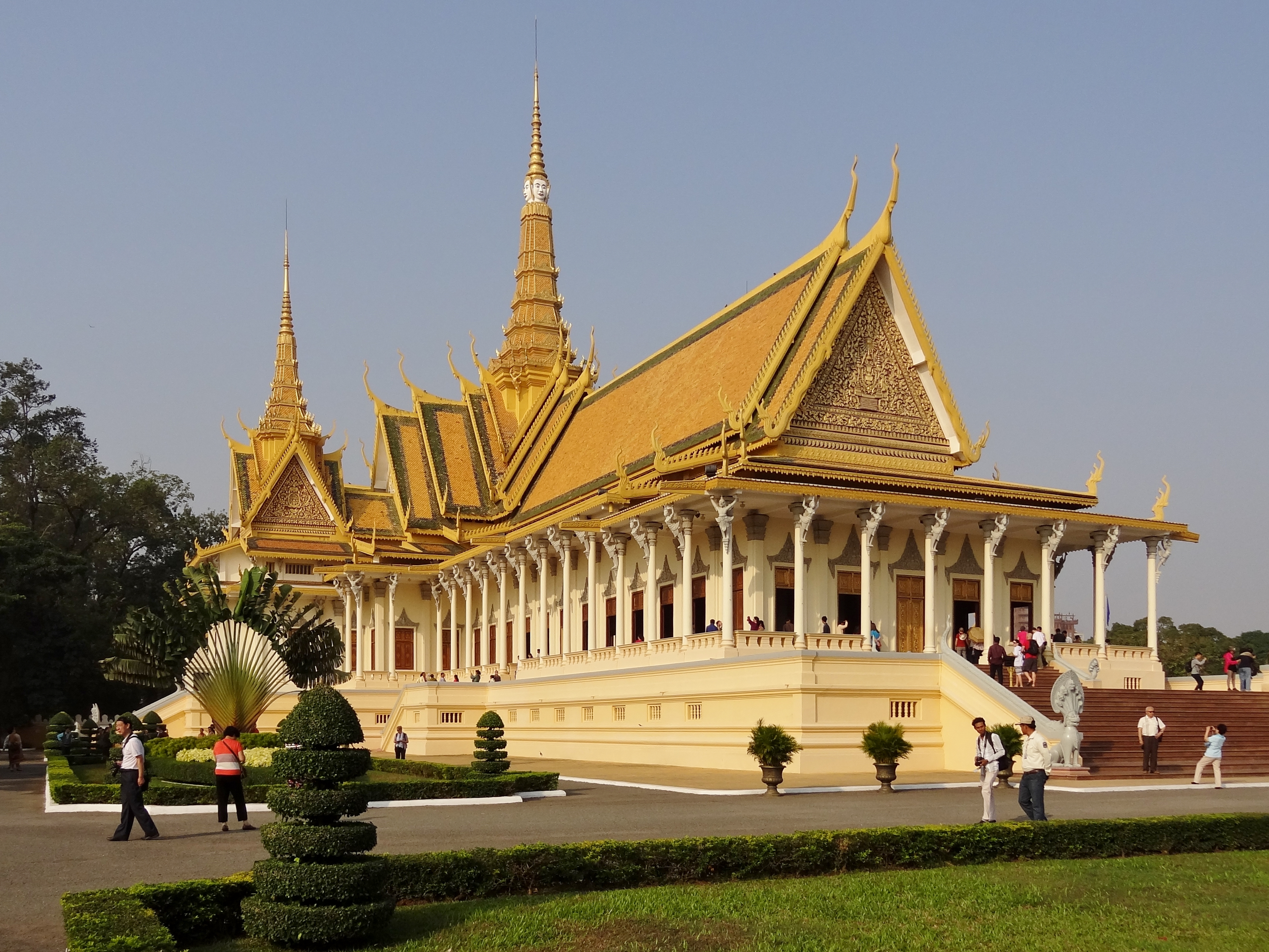
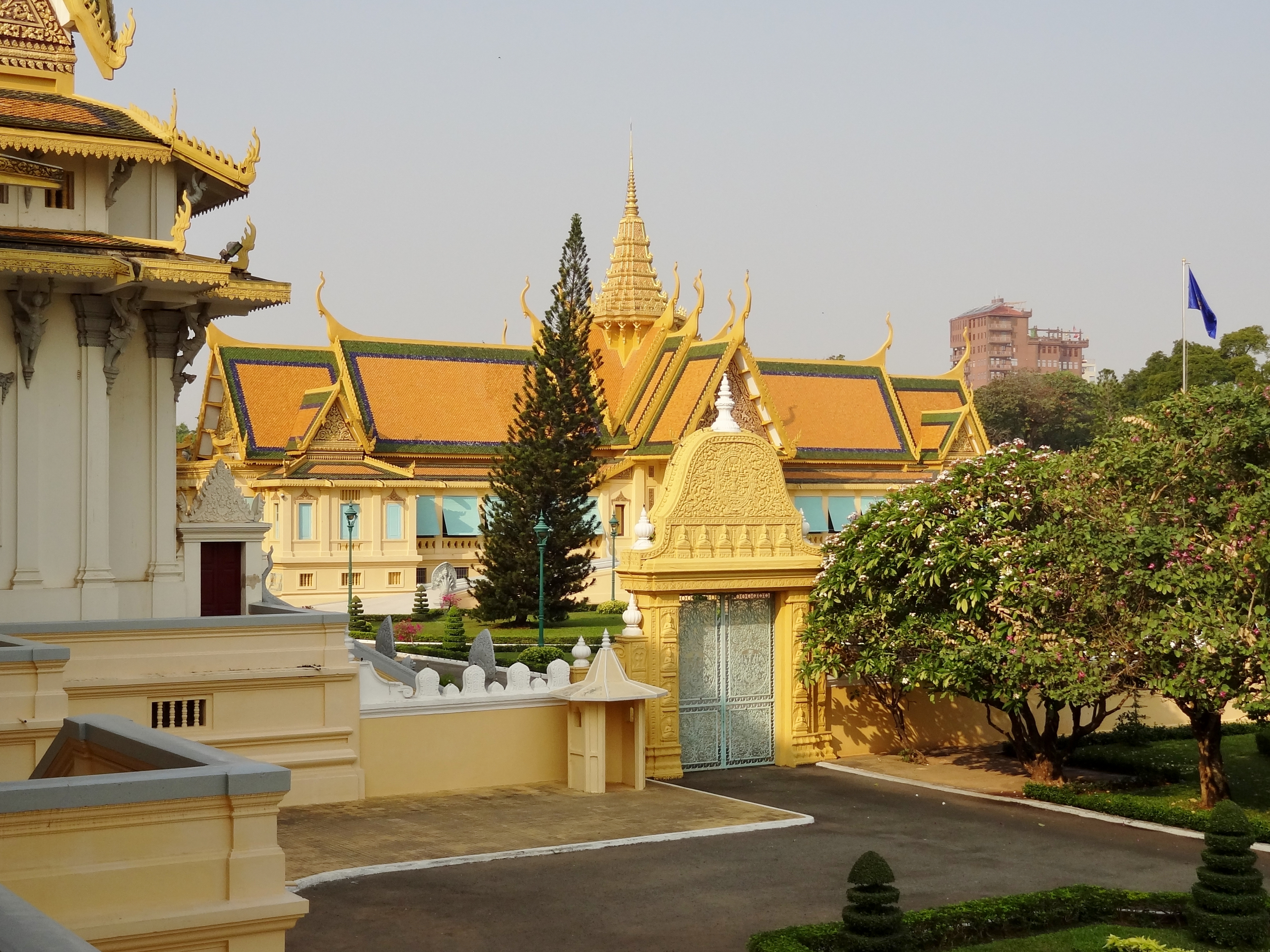
Royal Palace of Cambodia: Throne Hall (left) and the Khemarin Palace (right)
- Royal Palace, Phnom Penh – residence of the King of Cambodia, Phnom Penh
- The Royal Residence – residence of the Royal Family of Cambodia, Siem Reap
- Ancient Palace, Phimeanakas – Ancient Palace, Siem Reap

== Canada ==
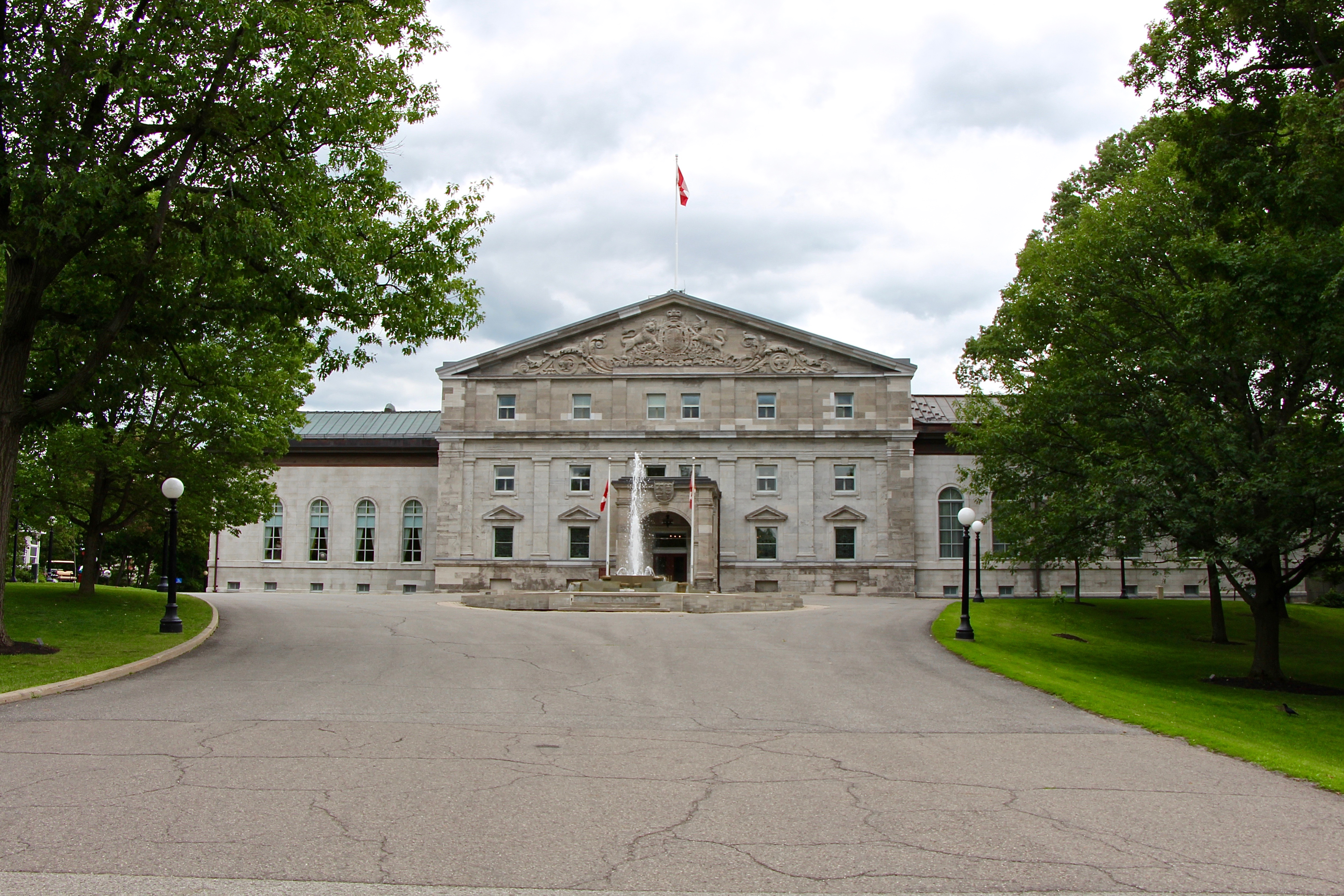
Rideau Hall.

- Rideau Hall – residence of the King of Canada, occupied predominantly by vice-regal Governor General
- Citadelle of Quebec
- Casa Loma – Home of Sir Henry Mill Pellatt.

Residences of provincial Lieutenant-Governors:

- Government House (British Columbia)
- Government House (Manitoba)
- Government House (Newfoundland and Labrador)
- Government House (Nova Scotia)
- Government House (Prince Edward Island)
- Government House (Saskatchewan)
- Old Government House, New Brunswick

== Chile ==
- Palacio de Cerro Castillo
- Palacio de La Moneda
- Palacio de las Majadas de Pirque

== China ==
The English word "palace" is used to translated the Chinese word 宮 (pronounced "gōng" in Mandarin). This character represents two rooms connected (呂), under a roof (宀). Originally the character applied to any residence or mansion, but starting with the Qin dynasty (3rd century BC) it was used only for the residence of the emperor and members of the imperial family. Chinese palaces are different from post-Renaissance European palaces in the sense that they are not made up of one building only (however big and convoluted the building may be), but are in fact huge spaces surrounded by a wall and containing large separated halls (殿 diàn) for ceremonies and official business, as well as smaller buildings, galleries, courtyards, gardens, and outbuildings, more like the Roman or Carolingian palatium.

The world's largest palace to have ever existed, the Weiyang Palace, was built in the Han dynasty. The world's largest palace currently still in existence, the Forbidden City, was constructed in the Ming dynasty.

=== List of Chinese imperial palaces, in chronological order ===
This is an incomplete list of Chinese palaces.

- Xianyang Palace (咸陽宮), in (Qin) Xianyang (咸陽), now 15 km/9 miles east of modern Xianyang, Shaanxi province: this was the royal palace of the state of Qin before the Chinese unification, and then the palace of the First Emperor when China was unified.
- Epang Palace (阿房宮 – probable meaning: "The Palace on the Hill"), 20 km/12 miles south of (Qin) Xianyang (咸陽), now 15 km/9 miles west of Xi'an (西安), Shaanxi province: the fabulous imperial palace built by the First Emperor in replacement of Xianyang Palace.
- Weiyang Palace (未央宮 – "The Endless Palace"), in (Han) Chang'an (長安), now 7 km/4 miles northeast of downtown Xi'an (西安), Shaanxi province: imperial palace of the prestigious Western Han dynasty for two centuries. This is the largest palace ever built on Earth, covering 4.8 km^{2} (1,200 acres), which is 6.7 times the size of the Forbidden City, or 11 times the size of the Vatican City.
- Southern Palace (南宮) and Northern Palace (北宮), in Luoyang (洛陽), Henan province: imperial palaces of the Eastern Han Dynasty for two centuries, the Southern Palace being used for court hearings and audiences, Northern Palace being the private residence of the emperor and his concubines.
- Taiji Palace (太極宮 – "Palace of the Supreme Ultimate"), also known as the Western Apartments (西内), in (Tang) Chang'an (長安), now downtown Xi'an (西安), Shaanxi province: imperial palace during the Sui dynasty (who called it Daxing Palace – 大興宮, "Palace of Great Prosperity") and in the beginning of the Tang dynasty (until A.D. 663). Area: 4.2 km^{2} (1,040 acres), imperial section proper: 1.92 km^{2} (474 acres).
- Daming Palace (大明宮 – "Palace of Great Brightness"), also known as the Eastern Apartments (東内), in (Tang) Chang'an (長安), now downtown Xi'an (西安), Shaanxi province: imperial palace of the Tang dynasty after A.D. 663 (it was briefly named Penglai Palace (蓬萊宮) between 663 and 705), but the prestigious Taiji Palace remained used for major state ceremonies such as coronations. Area: 3.11 km^{2} (768 acres), almost 4.5 times the size of the Forbidden City.
- Kaifeng Imperial Palace (東京大内皇宮), in Dongjing (東京), now called Kaifeng (開封), Henan province: imperial palace of the Northern Song dynasty.
- Hangzhou Imperial Palace (臨安大内禁宮), in Lin'an (臨安), now called Hangzhou (杭州), Zhejiang province: imperial palace of the Southern Song dynasty.
- Karakorum (哈拉和林), site of the imperial palace of the Mongol Empire.
- Shangdu (元上都) and Khanbaliq (元大都), locations of the imperial palaces of the Yuan dynasty.
- Ming Imperial Palace (明故宮), in Nanjing (南京), Jiangsu province: imperial palace of the Ming dynasty until 1421.

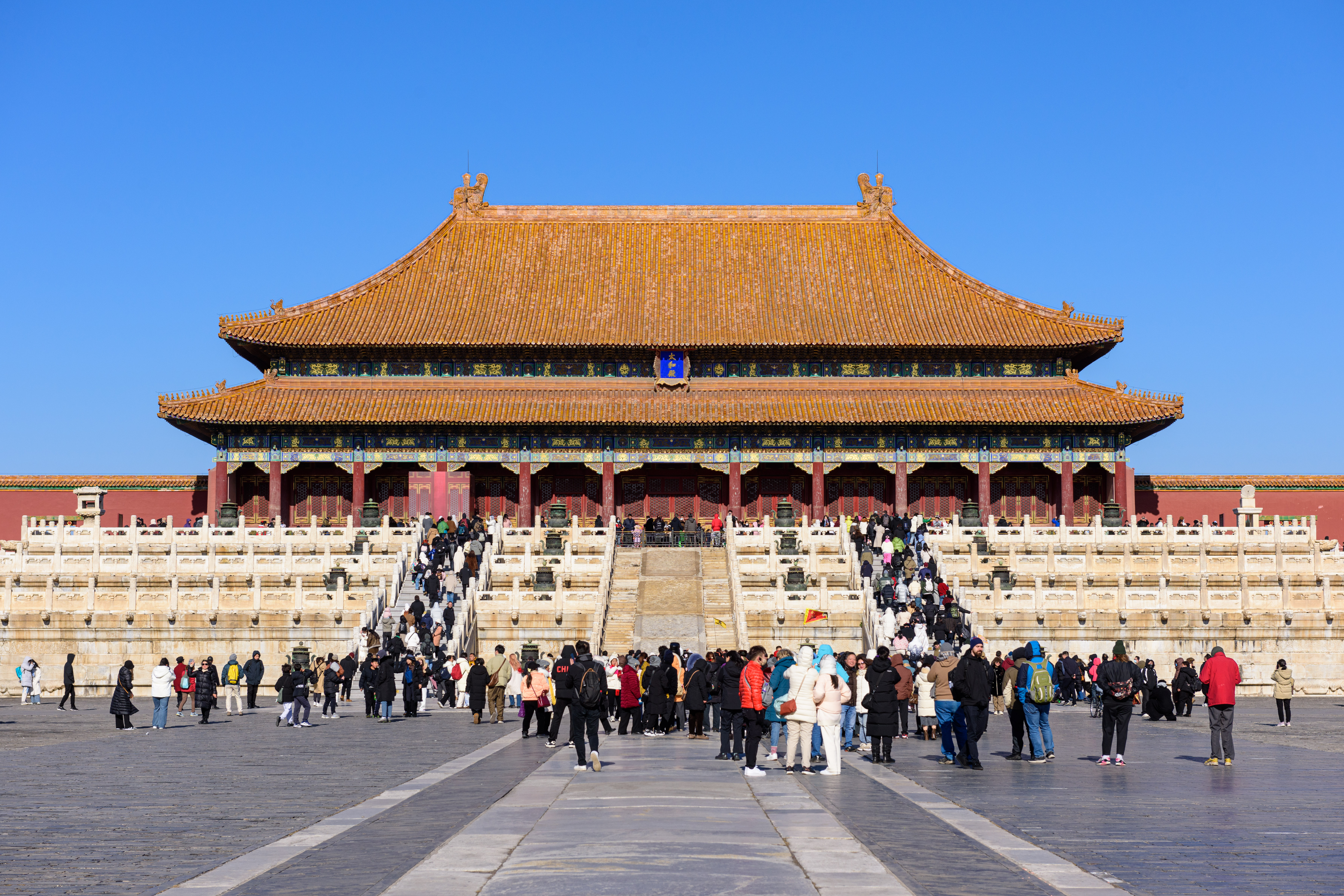
Hall of Supreme Harmony, Forbidden City, Beijing

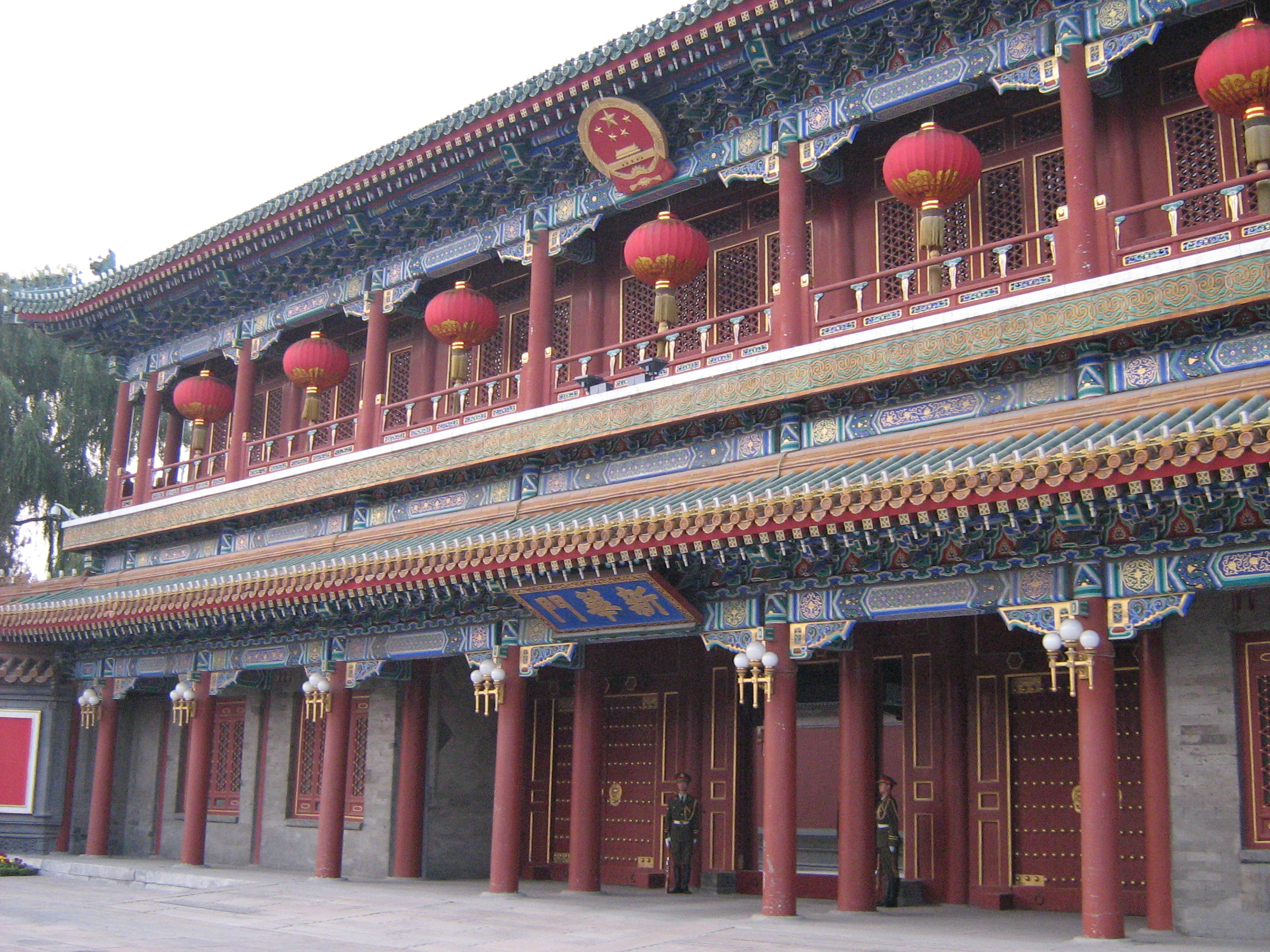
Xinhua Gate, formal entrance to the Zhongnanhai compound.

- Forbidden City (紫禁城), now known in China as Beijing's Old Palace (北京故宫), in Jingshi (京師), now called Beijing (北京): imperial palace of the Ming dynasty and Qing dynasty from 1421 until 1924. Area: 720,000 m^{2} (178 acres). The Forbidden City is the world's largest palace currently in existence.

Apart from the main imperial palace, Chinese dynasties also had several other imperial palaces in the capital city where the empress, crown prince, or other members of the imperial family dwelled. There also existed palaces outside of the capital city called "away palaces" (離宮) where the emperors resided when traveling. The habit also developed of building garden estates in the countryside surrounding the capital city, where the emperors retired at times to get away from the rigid etiquette of the imperial palace, or simply to escape from the summer heat inside their capital. This practice reached a zenith with the Qing dynasty, whose emperors built the fabulous Imperial Gardens (御園), now known in China as the Gardens of Perfect Brightness (圓明園), and better known in English as the Old Summer Palace. The emperors of the Qing Dynasty resided and worked in the Imperial Gardens, 8 km/5 miles outside of the walls of Beijing, the Forbidden City inside Beijing being used only for formal ceremonies.

These gardens were made up of three gardens: the Garden of Perfect Brightness proper, the Garden of Eternal Spring (長春園), and the Elegant Spring Garden (綺春園); they covered a huge area of 3.5 km^{2} (865 acres), almost 5 times the size of the Forbidden City, and 8 times the size of the Vatican City. comprising hundreds of halls, pavilions, temples, galleries, gardens, lakes, etc. Several famous landscapes of southern China had been reproduced in the Imperial Gardens, hundreds of invaluable Chinese art masterpieces and antiquities were stored in the halls, making the Imperial Gardens one of the largest museum in the world. Some unique copies of literary work and compilations were also stored inside the Imperial Gardens. In 1860, during the Second Opium War, the British and French expeditionary forces looted the Old Summer Palace. Then on October 18, 1860, in order to "punish" the imperial court, which had refused to allow Western embassies inside Beijing, the British general Lord Elgin – with protestations from the French – purposely ordered to set fire to the huge complex which burned to the ground. It took 3500 British troops to set the entire place ablaze and took three whole days to burn. The burning of the Gardens of Perfect Brightness is still a very sensitive issue in China today.

Following this cultural catastrophe, the imperial court was forced to relocate to the old and austere Forbidden City where it stayed until 1924, when the Last Emperor was expelled by a republican army. Empress dowager Cixi (慈禧太后) built the Summer Palace (頤和園 – "The Garden of Nurtured Harmony") near the Old Summer Palace, but on a much smaller scale than the Old Summer Palace. There are currently some projects in China to rebuild the Imperial Gardens, but this appears as a colossal undertaking, and no rebuilding has started yet.

=== Other palaces ===
Some other palaces include:

- Summer Palace in Beijing
- Mukden Palace in Shenyang
- Chengde Mountain Resort at Chengde
- Potala Palace in Lhasa – Main residence of the Dalai Lama
- Norbulingka Palace in Lhasa – Summer palace of the Dalai Lama
- Spring Fragrance Palace in Fujian

== Colombia ==
- Palacio de Nariño
- Palacio Lievano
- Palacio de San Francisco

== Croatia ==
- Diocletian's Palace
- Eltz Manor

== Czech Republic ==
=== Prague ===
- Archbishop's Palace (Prague)
- Belvedere (Prague)
- Czernin Palace (Prague)
- Clam-Gallas Palace (Prague)
- Kaunitz Palace (Prague)
- Kinsky Palace (Prague) – former residence of the Kinsky princely family
- Kolowrat Palace (Prague, Hradcanske namesti)
- Kolowrat Palace (Prague, Loretanska)
- Kolowrat Palace (Prague, Ovocny trh)
- Kolowrat Palace (Prague, Valdstejnska)
- Liechtenstein Palace (Prague, Kampa Island)
- Liechtenstein Palace (Prague, Malostranské náměstí)
- Lobkowicz Palace (Prague Castle)
- Lobkowicz Palace (Prague, Mala Strana)
- Martinic Palace (Prague)
- Morzin Palace (Prague)
- Old Royal Palace (Prague Castle)
- Palfy Palace (Prague)
- Prague Castle – built in a Palace style
- Rosenberg Palace (Prague)
- Salm Palace (Prague)
- Schönborn Palace (Prague)
- Sternberg Palace (Prague, Hradcany)
- Sternberg Palace (Prague, Mala Strana)
- Schwarzenberg Palace (Prague) – former residence of the Schwarzenberg princely family
- Thun Palace (Prague)
- Thun-Hohenstein Palace (Prague)
- Troja Palace (Prague)
- Tuscan Palace (Prague)
- Wallenstein Palace (Prague)

=== Elsewhere ===
- Archbishop's Palace (Kroměříž)

== Denmark ==
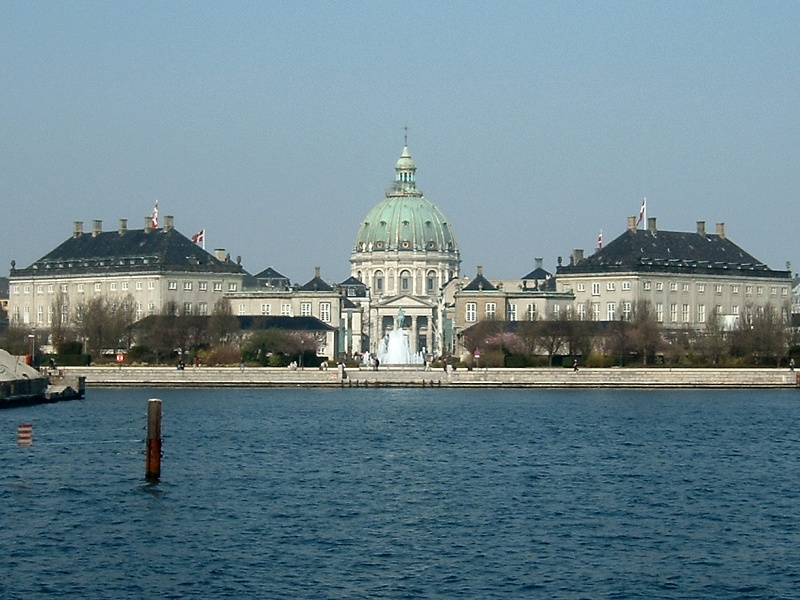
Amalienborg Palace

- Amalienborg Palace, winter palace of the Danish royal family, Copenhagen
- Christiansborg Palace, Copenhagen
- Fredensborg Palace, spring and autumn residence of the Danish monarch, Fredensborg
- Frederiksberg Palace, Frederiksberg municipality in Copenhagen City
- Frederiksborg Palace, Hillerød
- Gråsten Palace, summer residence of the Danish royal family, Gråsten
- Kastellet, Copenhagen
- Rosenborg Castle, Copenhagen
- Charlottenlund Palace, Copenhagen
- Kronborg Castle, Elsinore (at which Shakespeares "Hamlet" takes place)

== Egypt ==
=== Pharaonic ===
- 16th century BC Unknown king palace, Ballas
- 14th century BC Palace of Amenhotep III in Malkata (or Malqata) in Luxor
- 1346 BC Amarna palaces of Pharaoh Akhenaten, in al-Minya
- 14th century BC Amenhotep III palace at Avaris (Pi-Ramesses), in Eastern desert
- 13th century BC Palace of the Pharaoh Merenptah in Memphis, Egypt
- 13th century BC Palace of Rameses II, Ramesseum, Luxor
- 13th century BC Palace of Rameses II, Fayoum
- 1175 BC The Temple & Palace of Rameses III at Medinet Habu, Egypt
- 6th century BC Palace of Wahibre (Apries) in Memphis, Egypt

=== Ptolemaic ===
- Circa 2nd century BC The Ptolemaic palace in what is now Silsila district in Alexandria
- 50s BC Caesareum palace which was built by Cleopatra in honor of Julius Caesar or Mark Antony in Alexandria
- 50s BC Antirrhodus island palace, was erected off of Alexandria's mainland in the Eastern Harbour (later submerged by the sea)

=== Roman ===
- 100 AD Roman palace at El Haiz area in the Bahariya Oasis, western desert.

=== Arab-Islamic ===
- 870 AD Ahmad ibn Tulun Palace at al-Qatta'i in Old Cairo
- 12th–13th centuries and after: palaces built within the Citadel of Cairo
- 13th century Sultan al-Salih palace on Rhoda Island in Cairo
- 1293 Amir Alin Aq Palace at Bab al-Wazir Street, Tabbana Quarter, Cairo
- 14th century Palace of Manjak al Yusufi al Silahdar, Cairo
- 1313 Ablaq Palace built by Al-Nasir Muhammad in the Citadel of Cairo
  - Other associated structures built nearby include the Great Iwan
- 1330 Amir Qawsun Palace (Qawsoun Yashbak min Mahdi) in Cairo
- 1334 Beshtak Palace
- 1352 Amir Taz Palace in Cairo
- 1366 Palace of Emir Tashtimur (Hummus Akhdar) in Cairo
- 15th century Palace of al-Ghuri, Cairo
- 1496 Amir Mamay Palace (Bait al-Qady), Cairo
- 16th century Bayt Al-Razzaz palace or Palace of al-Ashraf Qaytbay, Darb Al-Ahmar, Cairo
- 1634 House of Gamal al-Din al-Dhahabi, Cairo
- 17th century and after: Bayt Al-Suhaymi, Cairo
- 18th century Qasr al-Aini (converted to Cairo University hospital)
- 1731 Harawi Residence
- 1779 Al Musafir Khana Palace (Kasr El Chok), at al-Jamaliyya, Old Cairo. Birthplace of Khedive Ismail. It was destroyed by fire in 1998
- 1790s Mohammed Bey al-Alfi Palace (where Napoleon lived during his Egyptian campaign).
- 1794 Bayt al-Sinnari (Palace). Now a museum.

=== Modern Egypt ===
- 19th century Bulaq palace of Ismail Pasha in Giza
- 19th century Mena House built by Khedive Ismail, at Giza near pyramids
- 19th century Kasr al-Nozha, the Cattaui (Egyptian Jewish industrialist) palace in Shubra
- 19th century Kasr al-Incha (now the ministry of defense)
- 19th century Kasr Kamal al-Din (former residence of the ministry of foreign affairs)
- 19th century Zaafarana palace (now the Ain Shams University administration building)
- 19th century Medhat Yegen Pasha's palace, Garden City, Cairo. (Demolished)
- 19th century Mahmoud Sami el-Baroudi palace in Giza now demolished
- 19th century Kasr al-Aali
- 19th century Kasr al-Mounira that became the French archeological center (IFAO).
- 19th century Kasr al-Amira Iffet Hassan that was later purchased by Princess Shuvekar Ibrahim before becoming the official seat of the council of ministers.
- 19th century El-Walda Pasha palace (now demolished).
- 1807 Muhammad Ali's Shubra Palace (Ain Shams faculty of agriculture)
- 1827 Harem Palaces at the Citadel of Cairo (now the Military museum)
- 1850s Kasr al-Ismailia, Cairo (now demolished, it was in the area of the Mogama El-Tahrir government complex)
- 1860s Khairy Pasha Palace, Cairo (became the campus of the American University in Cairo in the 1920s)
- 1814 Al-Gawhara Palace at Cairo citadel
- 1854 Qasr al-Nil (now demolished but the area in downtown Cairo still carries its name)
- 1863 Gezirah Palace (now a private hotel)
- 1863 Abdeen Palace, Cairo (former royal residence)
- 1897 Count Gabriel Habib El-Sakakini Pasha Palace, Cairo
- 1898 Anisa Wissa Palace, Fayoum.
- 1899 Prince Mohammed Ali Tewfik palace (now the Manyal Palace museum)
- 1899 Prince Said Halim Pasha Palace in downtown Cairo
- late 19th century Koubbeh Palace, El-Quba
- 20th century Fouad Serageddin Pasha's palace, Garden City
- 20th century EL-Dobara palace (now a government school)
- 20th century Tahra Palace, El-Zayton, Cairo
- 20th century Sultana Malak Palace, Heliopolis, Cairo
- 1901 Palace of Saad Zaghloul Pasha (Beit El-Omma Museum)
- 1911 Baron Empain Palace, Heliopolis, Cairo
- 1910 Heliopolis Palace, Heliopolis, Cairo
- 1915 Mohammed Mahmoud Khalil palace (now a museum)
- 1921 Prince Amr Ibrahim Palace, Zamalek (now the Museum of Islamic Ceramics)
- 1924 Kurmet Ibn Hani' (Ahmed Shawki museum)
- Unknown (before 1939) Prince Yousef Kamal Palace at Ain Shams district, now the Desert research institute
- Montaza Palace, Alexandria
- Ras Al-Teen Palace, Alexandria

== Estonia ==
- Kadriorg Palace of Peter the Great in Tallinn
- Toompea Palace of the governor of Reval Governorate in Tallinn

== Ethiopia ==
- Jubilee Palace (National Palace) – seat of the president, former imperial palace

== Finland ==
- Turku Castle, the only castle in Finland where there was for some time in the 16th century a real royal court.
- Presidential Palace

== Georgia ==
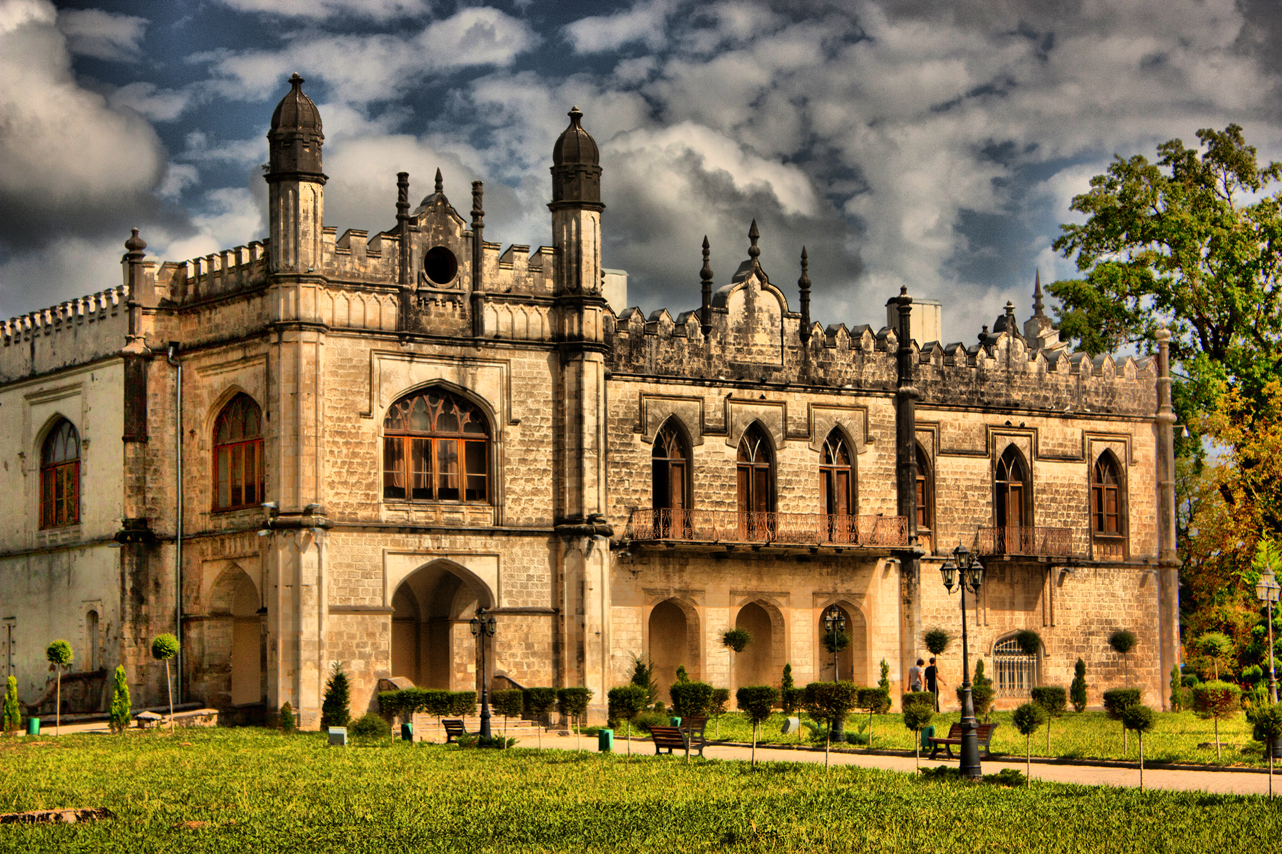
Dadiani Palace Zugdidi, Georgia

- Dadiani Palace
- Palace of Mukhrani
- Geguti
- Romanov Palace (1892–95)
- Vicegerent Palace

== Ghana ==
- The Manhyia Palace (Asantehene's Palace) – seat of the Asantehene of Ashanti, Kumasi
- The Flagstaff House (Presidential Palace) – seat of government until the late 1970s, Accra
- The Christianborg (Osu Castle) – former seat of the government till December 2008, Accra
- The Golden Jubilee Palace (Presidential Palace) formerly known as the "Flagstaff House" – seat of Government since December 2008, Accra
- The Abampredease Palace. Palace of Dormaahene

== Greece ==
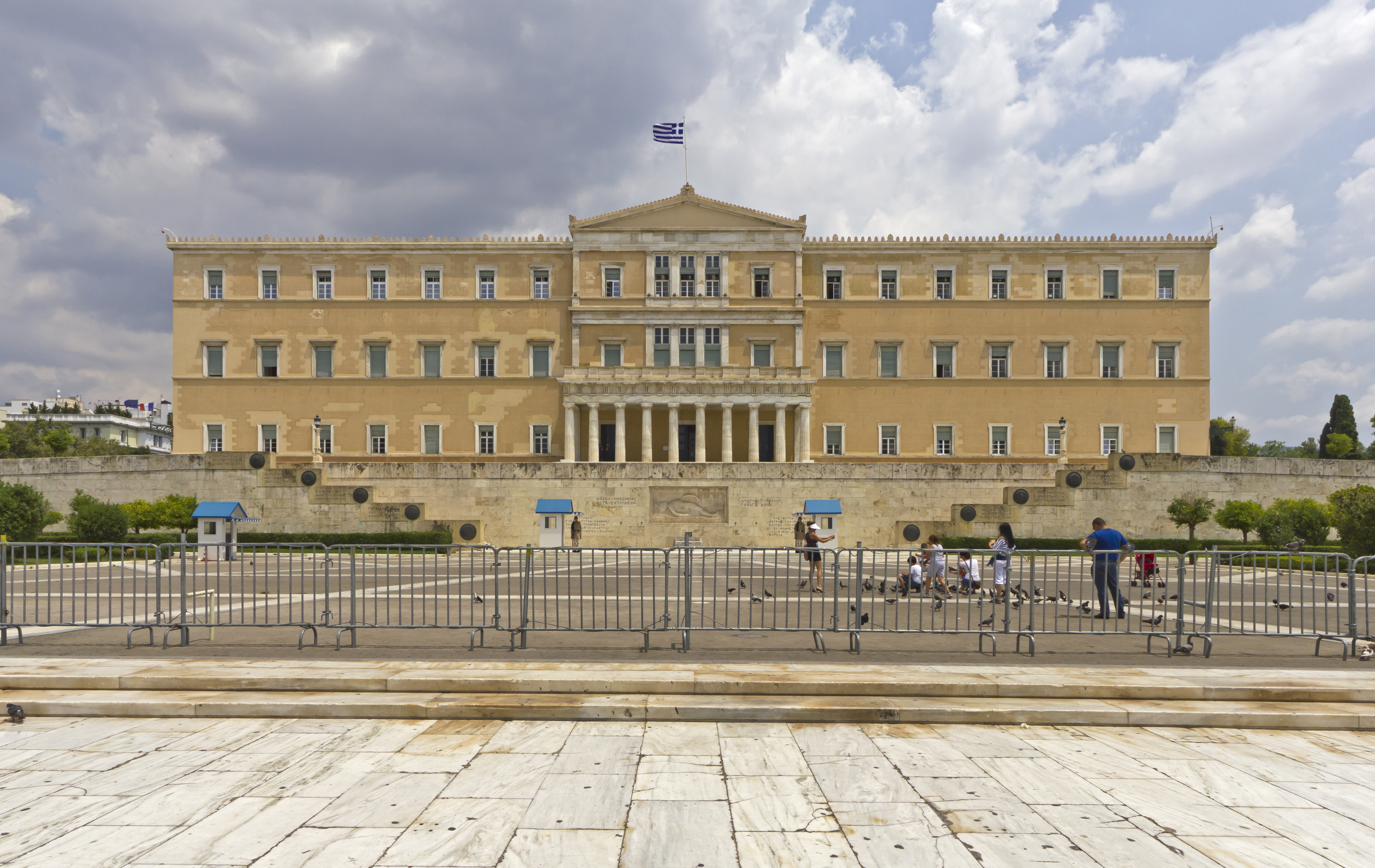
The Old Royal Palace today

- Achilleion (Corfu), built for Empress Elisabeth of Austria, later the summer palace for Kaiser Wilhelm II, now a museum
- Old Royal Palace
- Thessaloniki Government House, known as the "Little Palace" (Macedonia)
- Mon Repos (Museum)
- New Royal Palace (First Crown Prince's Palace; now Presidential Residence)
- Palace of Saint Michael and Saint George, in Corfu (now the Sino-Japanese Museum)
- Palace of the Grand Master of the Knights of Rhodes (built from the knight hospitaliers in the 14th century)
- Psychiko (Crown Prince Paul & Crown Princess Frederica)
- Queen's Tower (King Othon & Queen Amalia)
- Tatoi (Estate Outside of Athens)

== Haiti ==
- National Palace *demolished, 2 years after 2010 Haiti earthquake, plans to rebuild have not been set or disclosed – residence of the president of Haiti

== Hungary ==
- Andrássy Castle (Tiszadob) built between 1880 and 1885
- Buda Castle (Budapest) – former royal residence, now National Széchényi Library and National Gallery of Hungary
- Eszterháza (Fertőd) – palace of the House of Esterházy
- Esterházy Castle (Csákvár) 1781
- Festetics Palace (Keszthely) – palace of the Festetics Family near Lake Balaton
- Festetics Palace (Dég) 1815-1819
- L'Huillier-Coburg Palace (Edelény) built between 1716 and 1730 by Jean-Francois L'Huillier
- Károlyi Castle (Nagymágocs) a 19th-century eclectic and neo-baroque castle
- Károlyi Castle (Fehérvárcsurgó) built in classicist and eclectic style
- Nagytétény Palace (Budapest) built between 1743 and 1751
- Royal Castle of Gödöllő (Gödöllő) – former royal summer residence of the Hungarian Kings since 1867
- Sándor Palace (Budapest) – official residence and office of the president of the Republic of Hungary
- Savoy Castle (Ráckeve) an 18th-century Baroque style château

== India ==
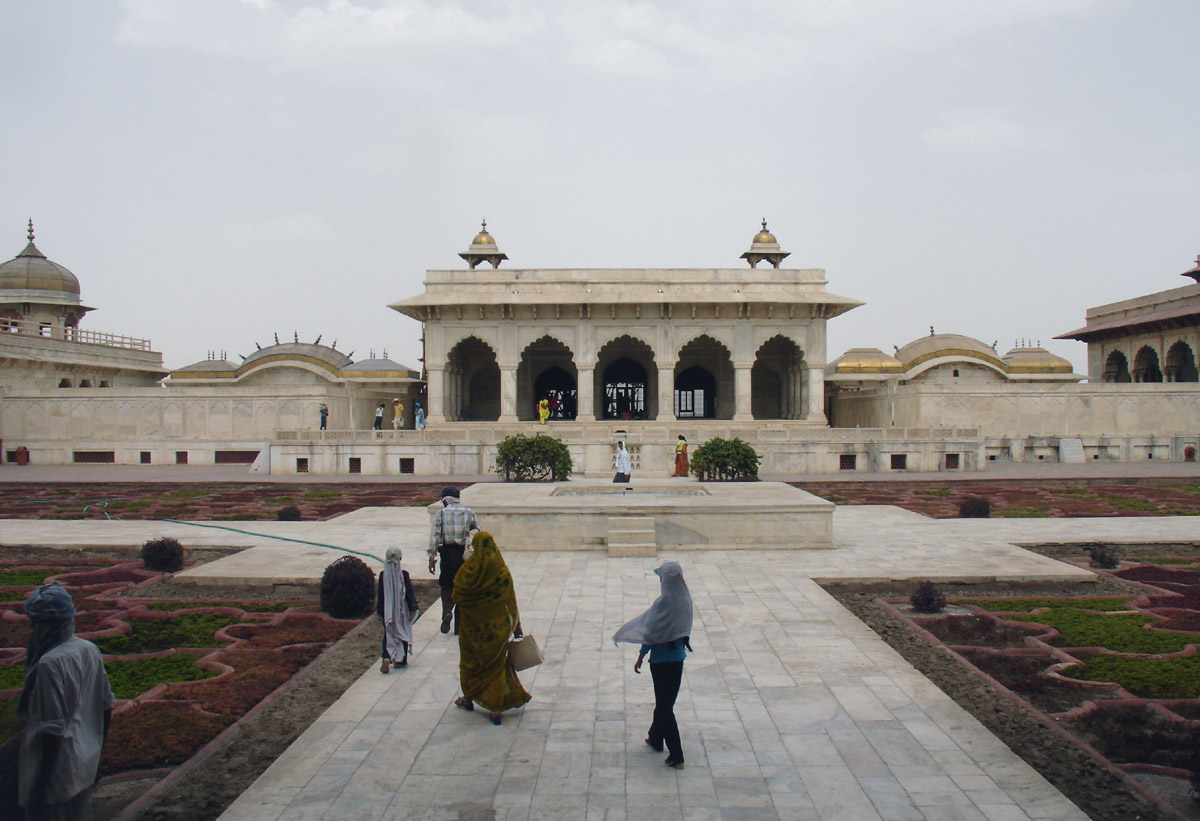
Khas Mahal, Agra Fort, Agra

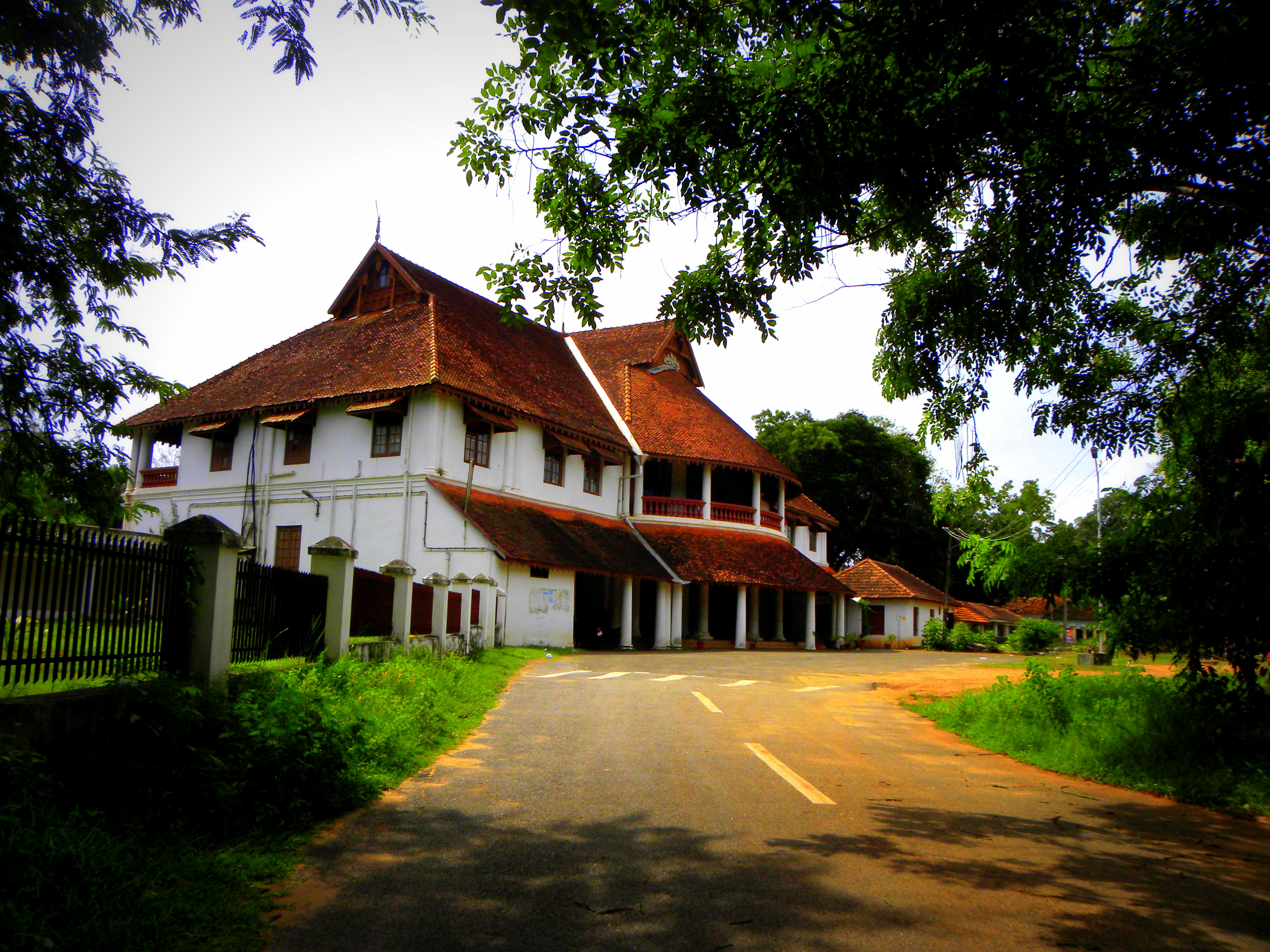
British Residency in Asramam, Kollam city

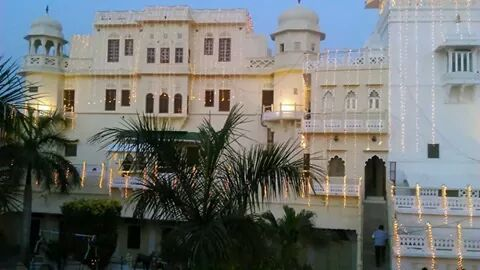
Palace of Bilara View

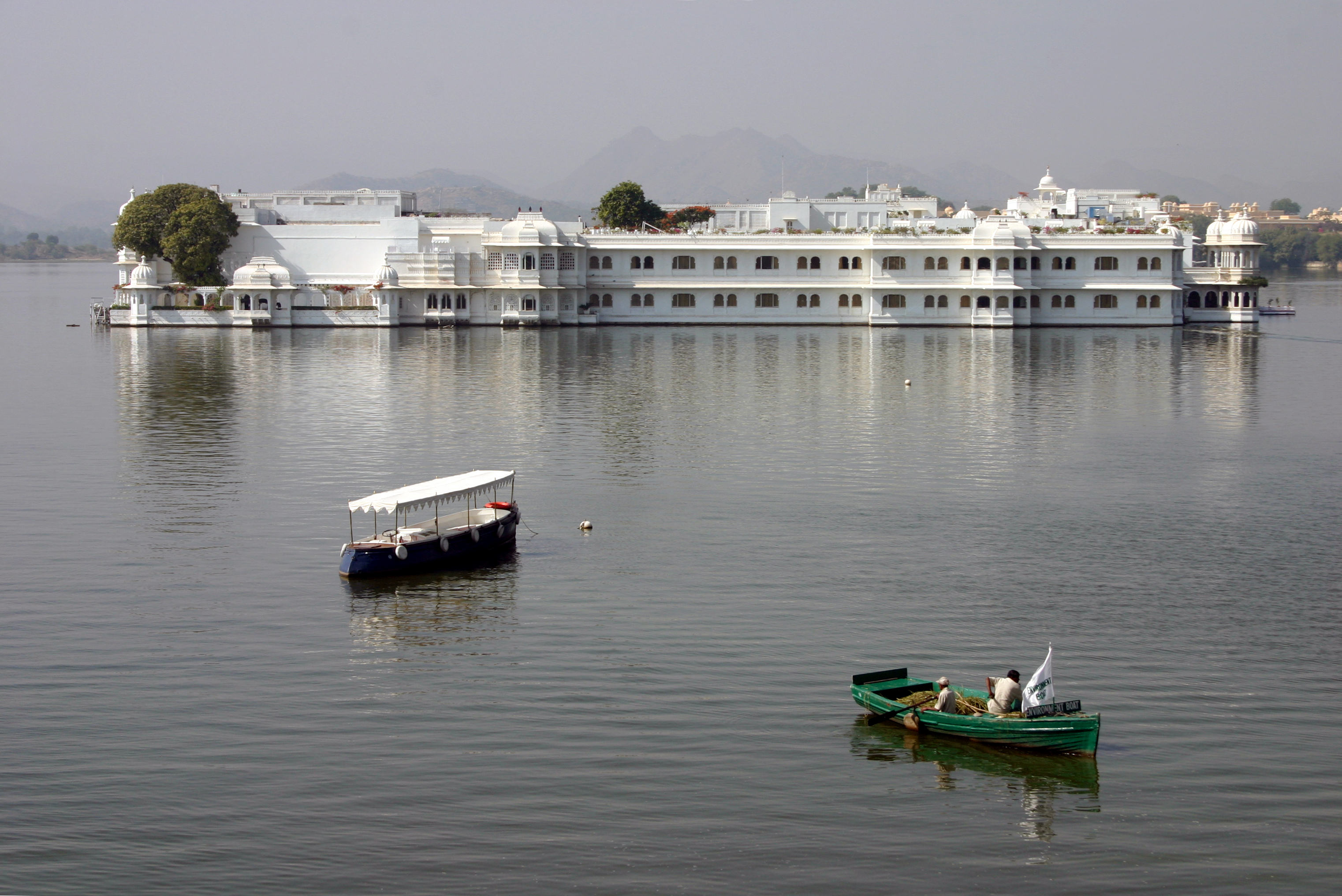
Lake Palace in Udaipur

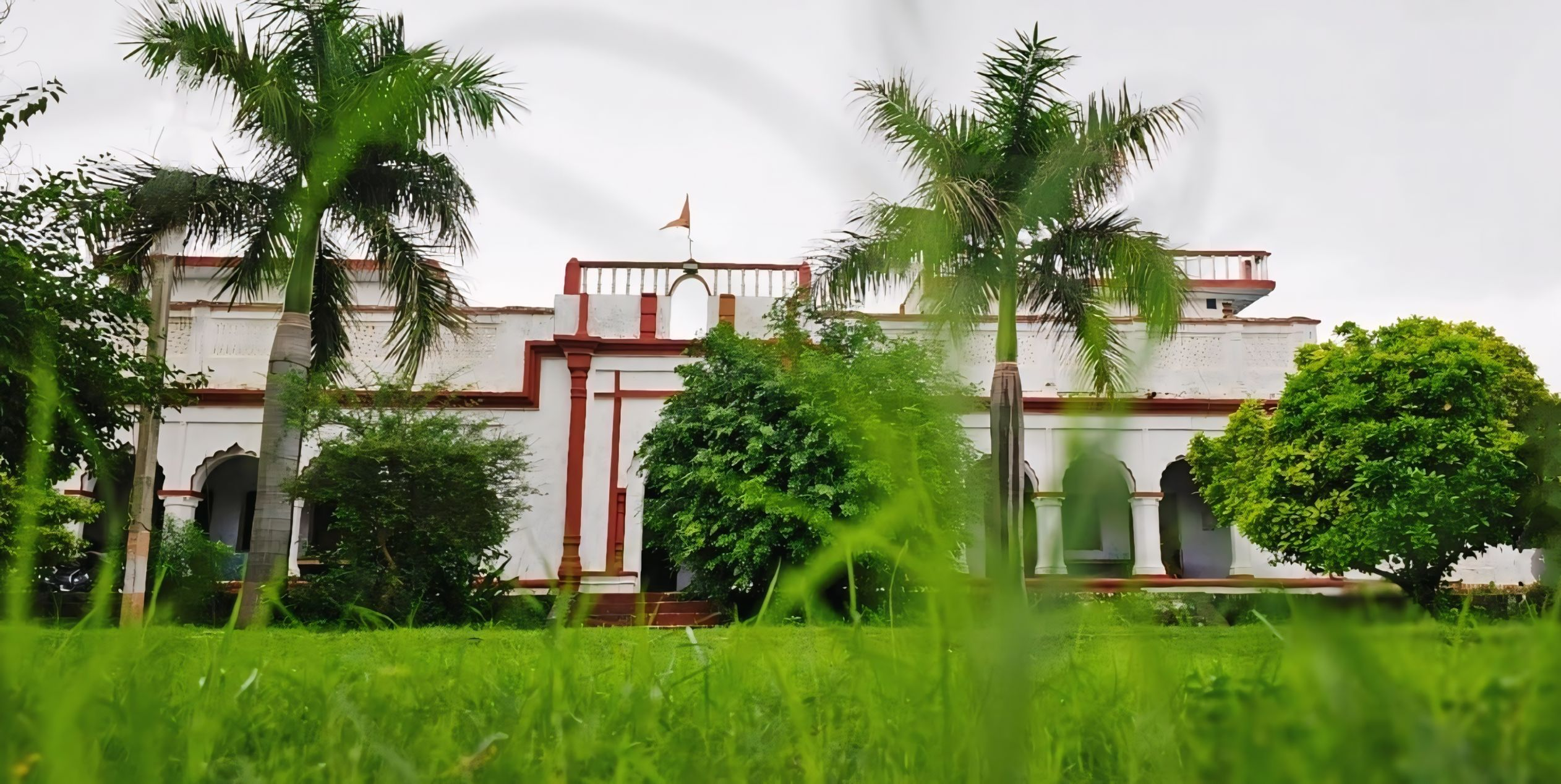
Kohra Palace

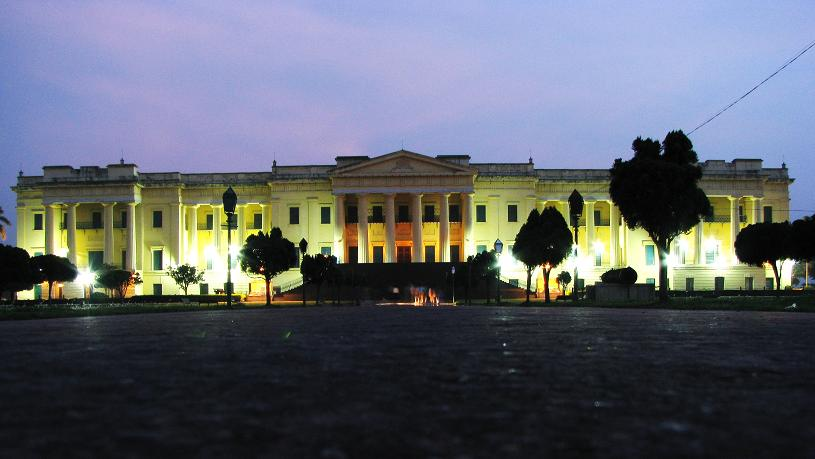
Hazarduari Palace was the residence of the Nawabs of Bengal and is now a museum.

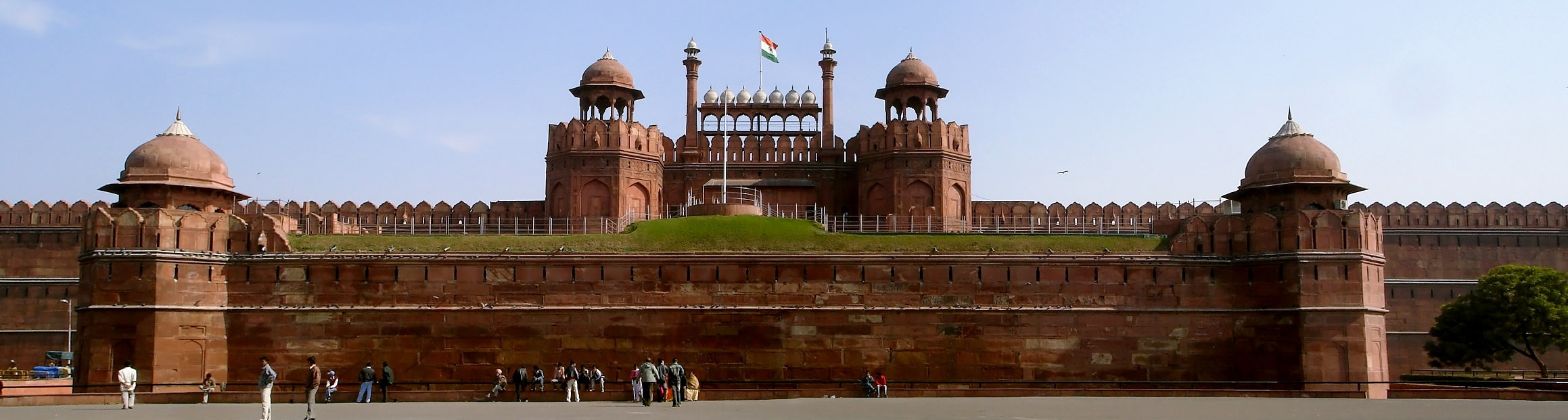
Red Fort in Delhi.

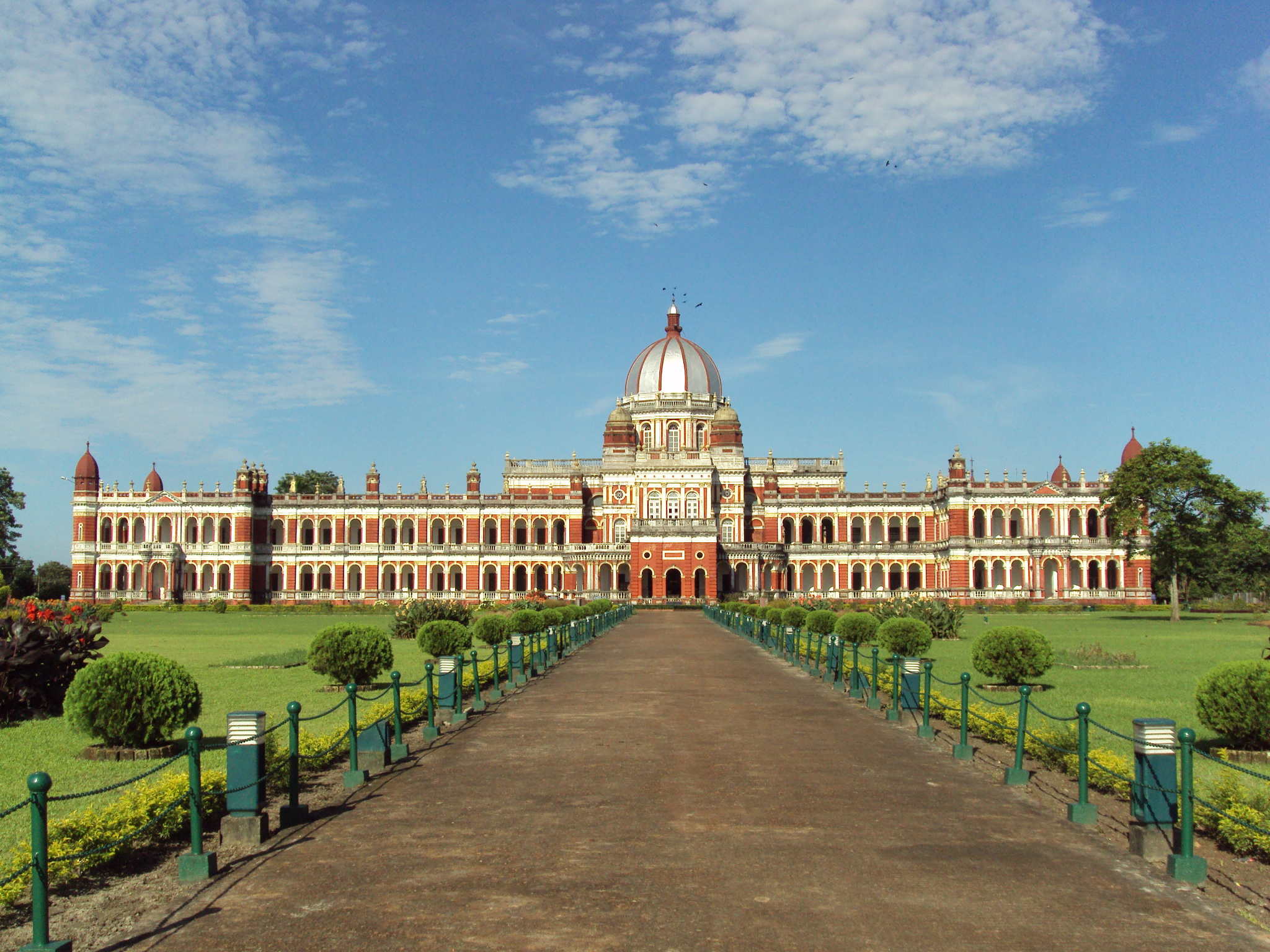
Cooch Behar Palace

- Agra Fort – former royal residence of the Moghul, Agra
- Aina Mahal – royal residence of ruler of Kutch.
- Amber Palace (Amber Fort) – former royal residence, Jaipur
- Amba Vilas Palace–Mysore
- Antilia – residence of entrepreneur Mukesh Ambani
- Arki Palace Himachal
- Bangalore Palace – Bengaluru
- Bilara Palace (Dist Jodhpur, Rajasthan
- Bhutan House – royal residence of the Dorji family, Kalimpong
- British Residency, Kollam – Architectural Marvel built by Col. John Munro
- Chatrapati Shahu palace – former royal residence of chatrapati shahu maharaj kolhapur
- Cheluvamba Vilas Palace-Mysore
- Chowmahalla Palace
- City Palace, Jaipur – seat of the Maharaja of Jaipur
- City Palace, Udaipur – seat of the Maharana of Udaipur
- Candra Mahal, Jaipur
- Chittor Fort, Chittorgarh – Largest Fort in India
- Cooch Behar Palace – former royal residence, Cooch Behar
- Delhi Fort – former seat of the Moghul, Delhi
- Falaknuma Palace – royal residence, Hyderabad
- Fatehpur Sikri – former royal residence of Emperor Akbar
- Gajlaxmi Palace – Palace of Singhdeo dynasty, Dhenkanal
- Gohar Mahal – former royal residence, Bhopal
- Gorbandh Palace, Jaisalmer
- Grand Palace, Srinagar – former royal residence, today hotel, Srinagar
- Hawa Mahal (Palace of Winds) – former royal residence, Jaipur
- Hazarduari Palace – former royal residence, Murshidabad
- Hill Palace, Tripunithura, Cochin – former Royal Residence of Maharaja of Cochin, now one of the largest archaeological museums in India
- Jagan Mohan Palace-Mysore
- Jag Mandir – former residence of Shah Jahan, Udaipur
- Jag Niwas (Lake Palace) – former royal residence, Udaipur
- Jai Mahal – former royal residence, today hotel, Jaipur
- Jaya Lakshmi Vilas Palace-Mysore
- Jai Vilas Palace – seat of the Maharaja of Gwalior
- Jaisalmer Fort – seat of the Maharaja of Jaisalmer
- Jhargram Palace – royal residence & heritage hotel, Jhargram
- Karanji Vilas Palace-Mysore
- Kangra Fort – seat of the Maharaja of Kangra-Lambagraon
- Kathgola – former estate of a zamindar (landowner), Murshidabad
- Khasbagh Palace – palace of the Maharaja of Rampur
- King Kothi Palace – palace of VII Nizam, Osman Ali Khan
- Kohra Palace – Seat of the Babu of Kohra (estate)
- Kowdiar Palace – residence of the Travancore Royal Family
- Lalgarh Palace – former royal residence, today hotel, Bikaner
- Laxmi Vilas Palace – seat of the Maharajah of Baroda
- Lakshmipuram Palace – is the royal palace of the Parappanad royal families at Changanassery
- Lalitha Mahal Palace-Mysore
- Laxmi Vilas Palace (also known as Anandbagh Palace) – seat of the Maharaja of Darbhanga, donated to Kameshwar Singh Sanskrit University. Now houses office of vice-chancellor and other officials of the university.
- Lokranjan Mahal-Mysore
- Marble Palace (Kolkata) – former residence of Raja Rajendra Mullick, Kolkata
- Mattancherry Palace (Dutch Palace), Cochin – former Royal Residence of Maharaja of Cochin, archeological museum at present.
- Nashipur Rajbari – former royal residence, Murshidabad
- Narain Niwas Palace – former royal residence, today hotel, Jaipur
- Nedumpuram Palace
- New Palace – seat of Maharaja of Kolhapur
- Padmanabhapuram Palace – seat of the Maharaja of Travancore
- Prag Mahal – royal palace of rulers of Kutch
- Purani Haveli – seat of the Nizam of Hyderabad
- Rajendra vilas Palace-Mysore
- Raj Mahal Palace – former royal residence, Jaipur (today hotel)
- Rajbari – seat of the Maharaja of Cooch Behar
- Rambagh Palace – former residence of the Maharaja of Jaipur (today hotel)
- Rashtrapati Bhavan – seat of the president, former viceregal residence, Delhi
- Red Fort – seat of many dynasties of India
- Samode Palace – former royal residence, today hotel, Jaipur
- Sarosi Palace, Seat of the Chaudhri of Sarosi estate
- Shaniwar Wada, Pune – royal residence of Peshwas
- Senior Bhonsle Palace, Nagpur- residence of maharja of nagpur
- Shaukat Mahal – former royal residence, Bhopal
- Thanjavur Nayak – Thanjavur (Tanjore) Nayak Palace, Thanjavur
- Thevally Palace, Kollam – Outhouse of erstwhile Travancore Kings
- Umaid Bhawan Palace – seat of the Maharaja of Jodhpur
- Uparkot Fort – former seat of the Chudasama of Junagadh, Gujarat
- Vasanth Mahal Palace-Mysore
- Vijay Vilas Palace, Mandavi – royal residence of rulers of Kutch
- Wasif Manzil – former royal residence, Murshidabad

== Indonesia ==
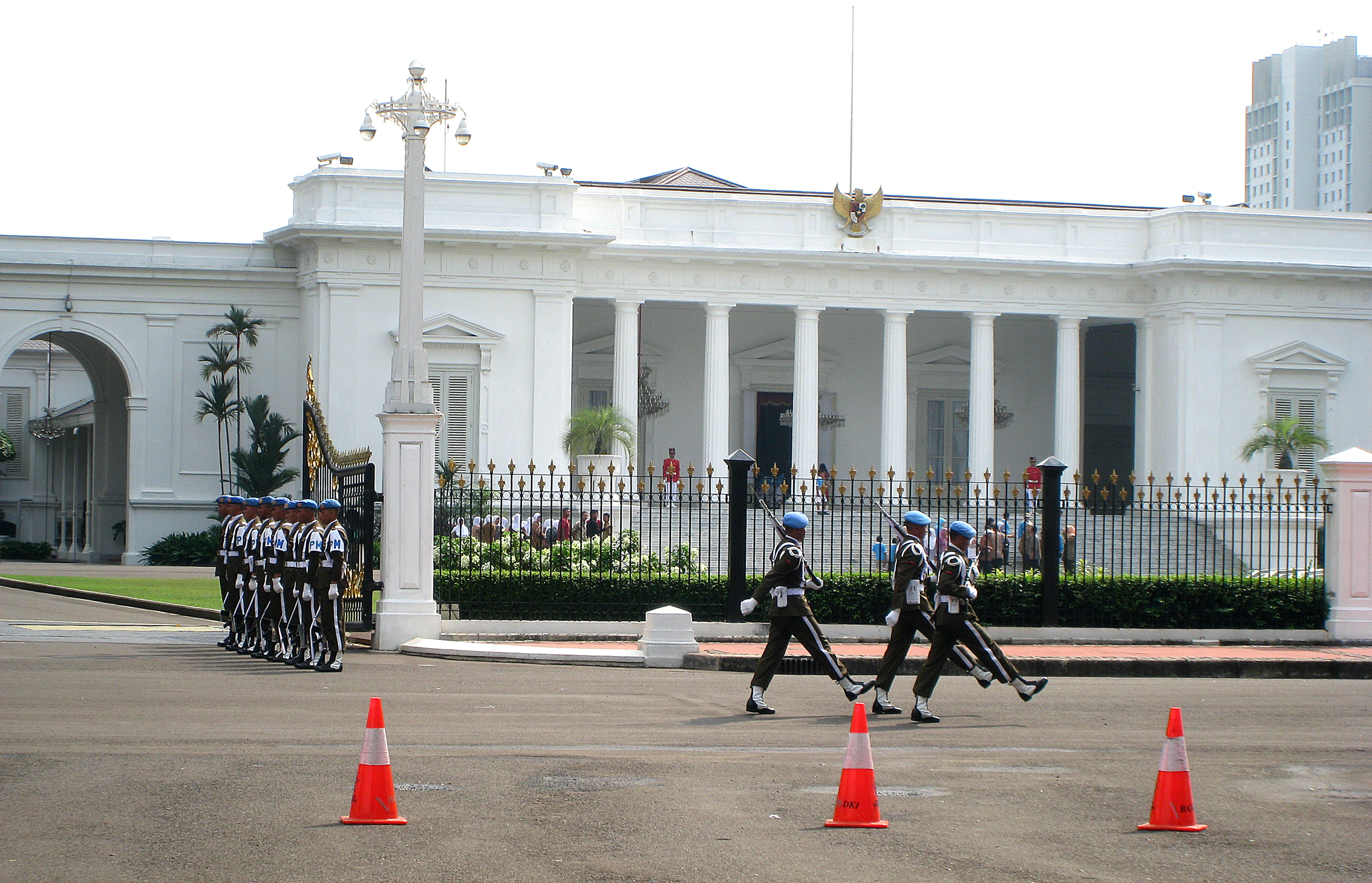
Istana Merdeka, the President Official Residence in Jakarta.

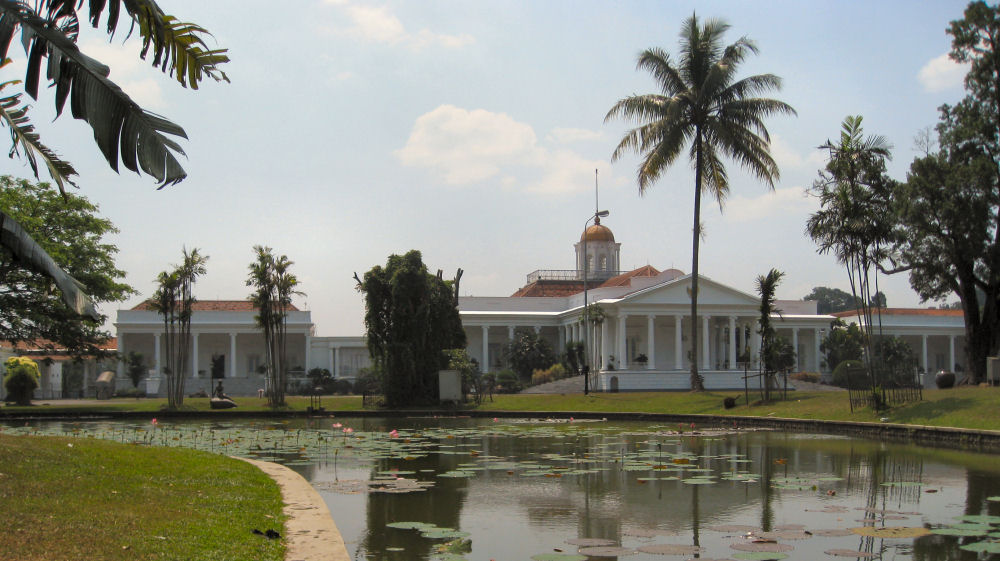
Istana Bogor, the Presidential Palace in Bogor.

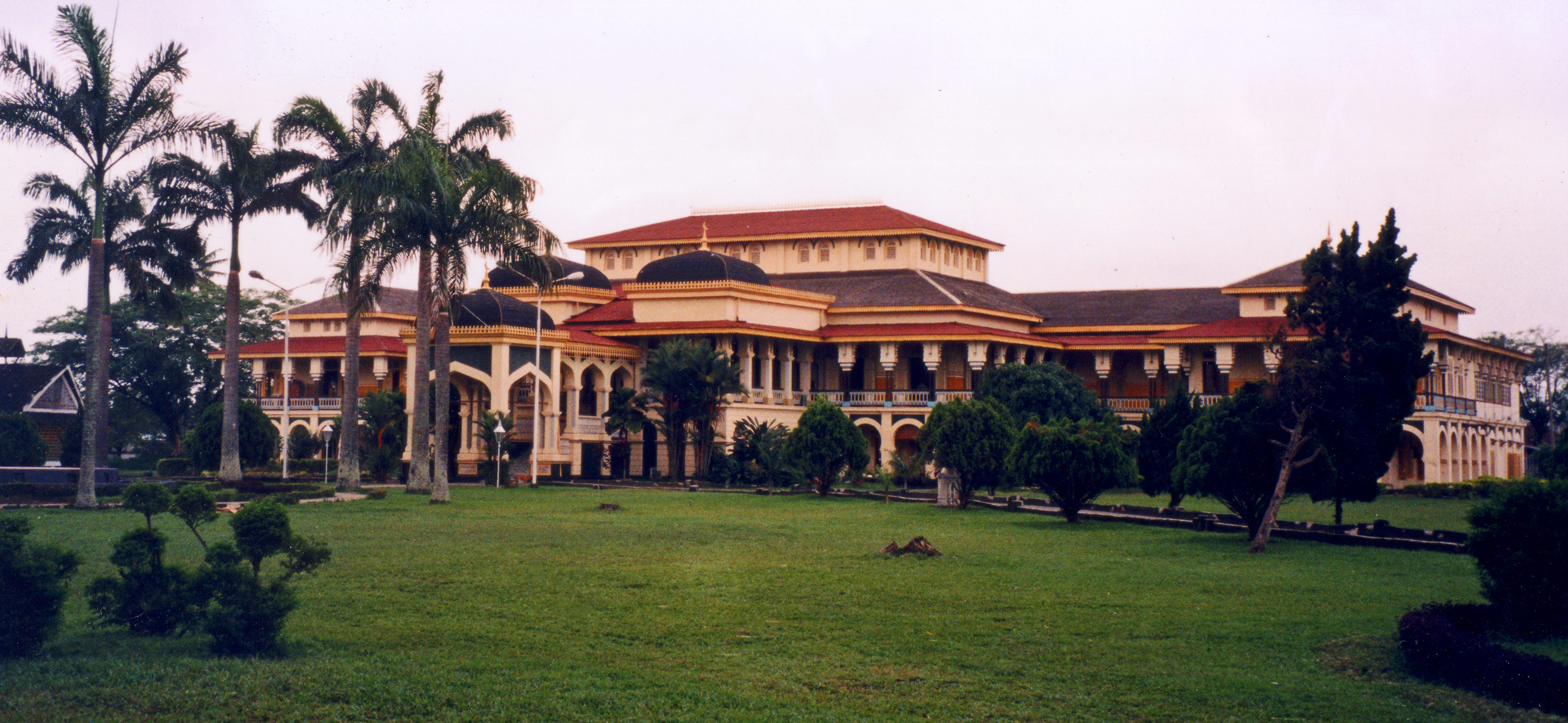
Istana Maimun or Maimun Palace, seat of Sultanate of Deli in Medan.

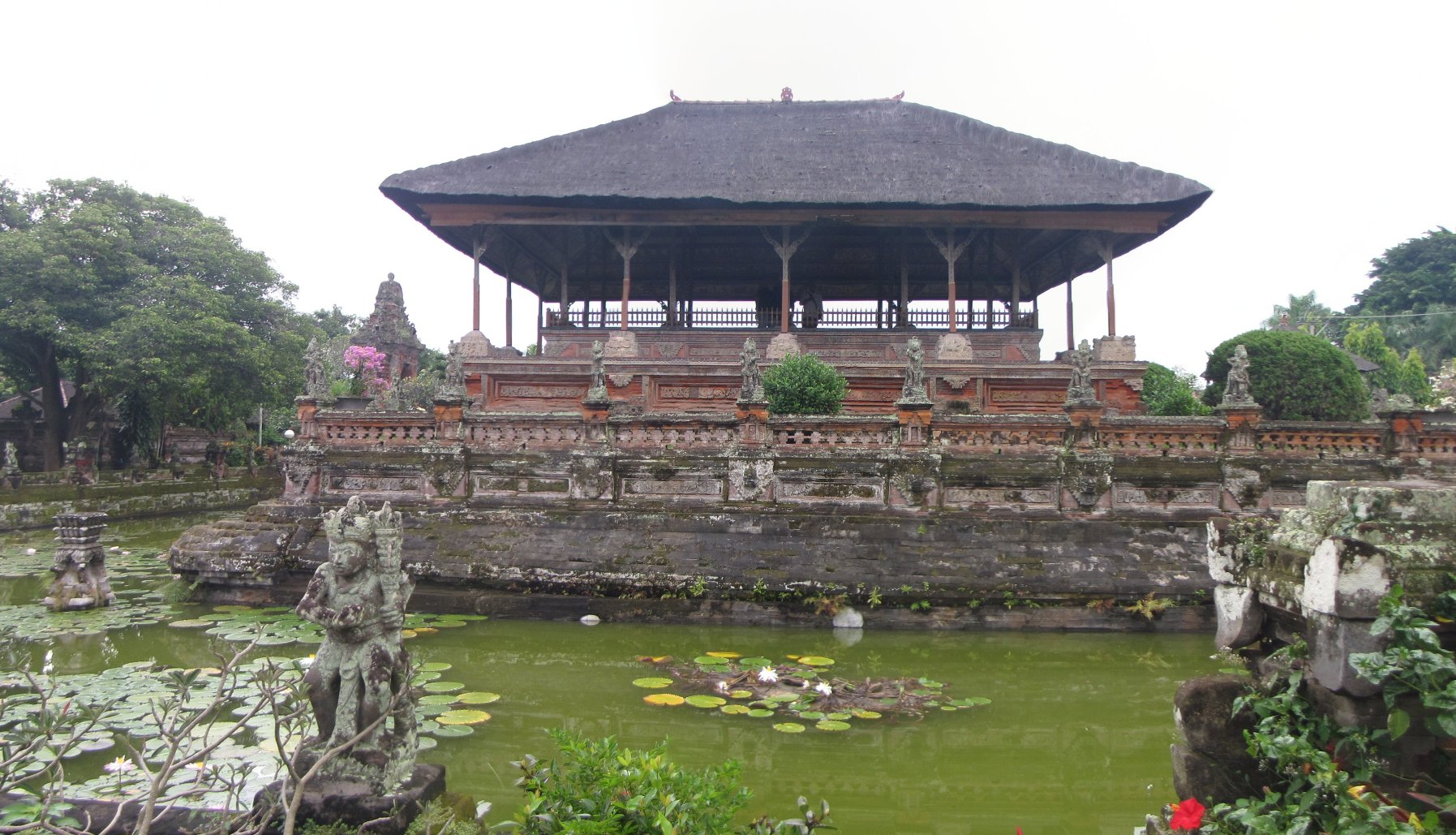
Puri Agung Klungkung or Klungkung Palace, seat of Kingdom of Klungkung in Klungkung Regency, Bali.

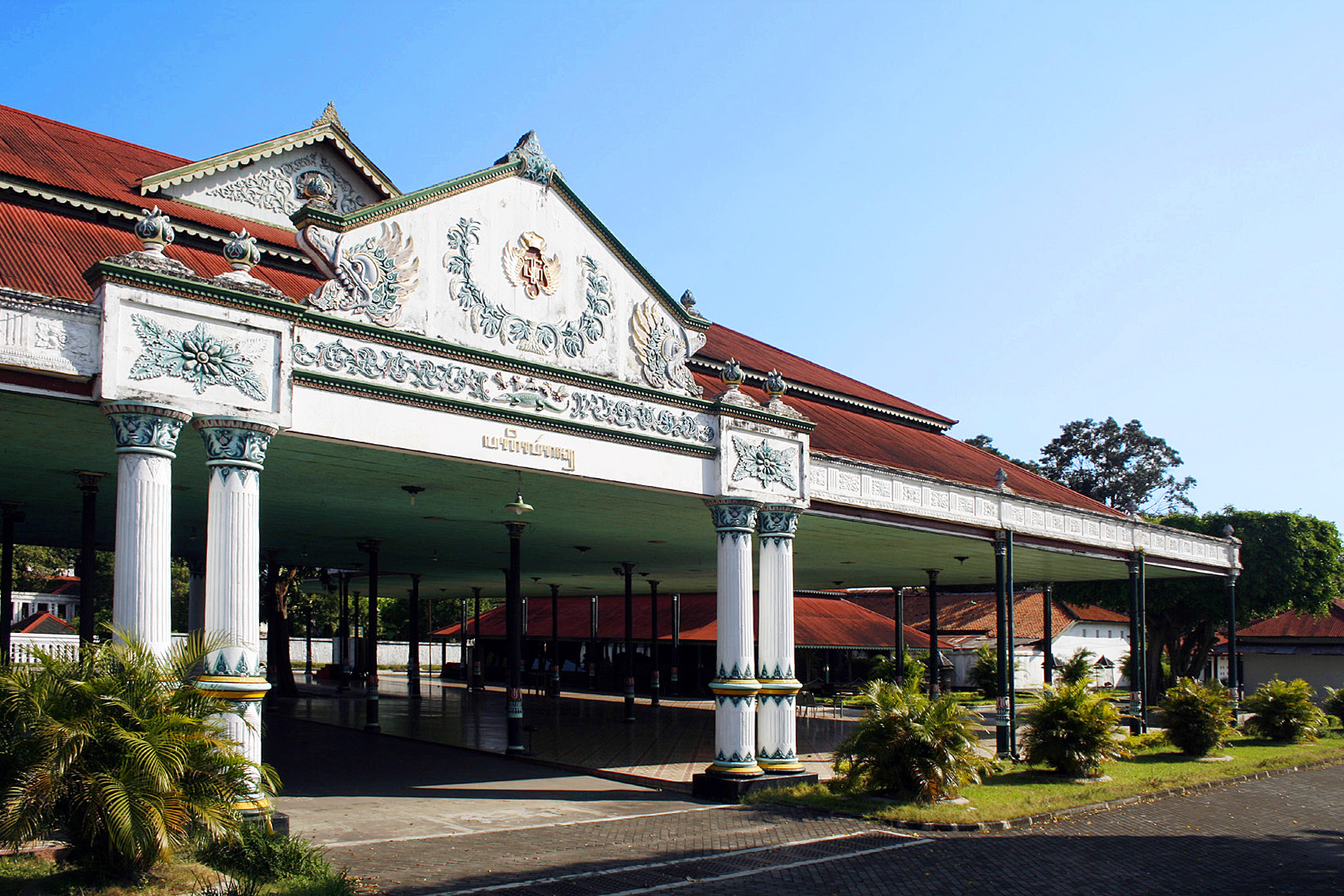
Kraton Ngayogyakarta Hadiningrat or Yogyakarta Royal Palace, seat of Sultanate of Yogyakarta in Yogyakarta.

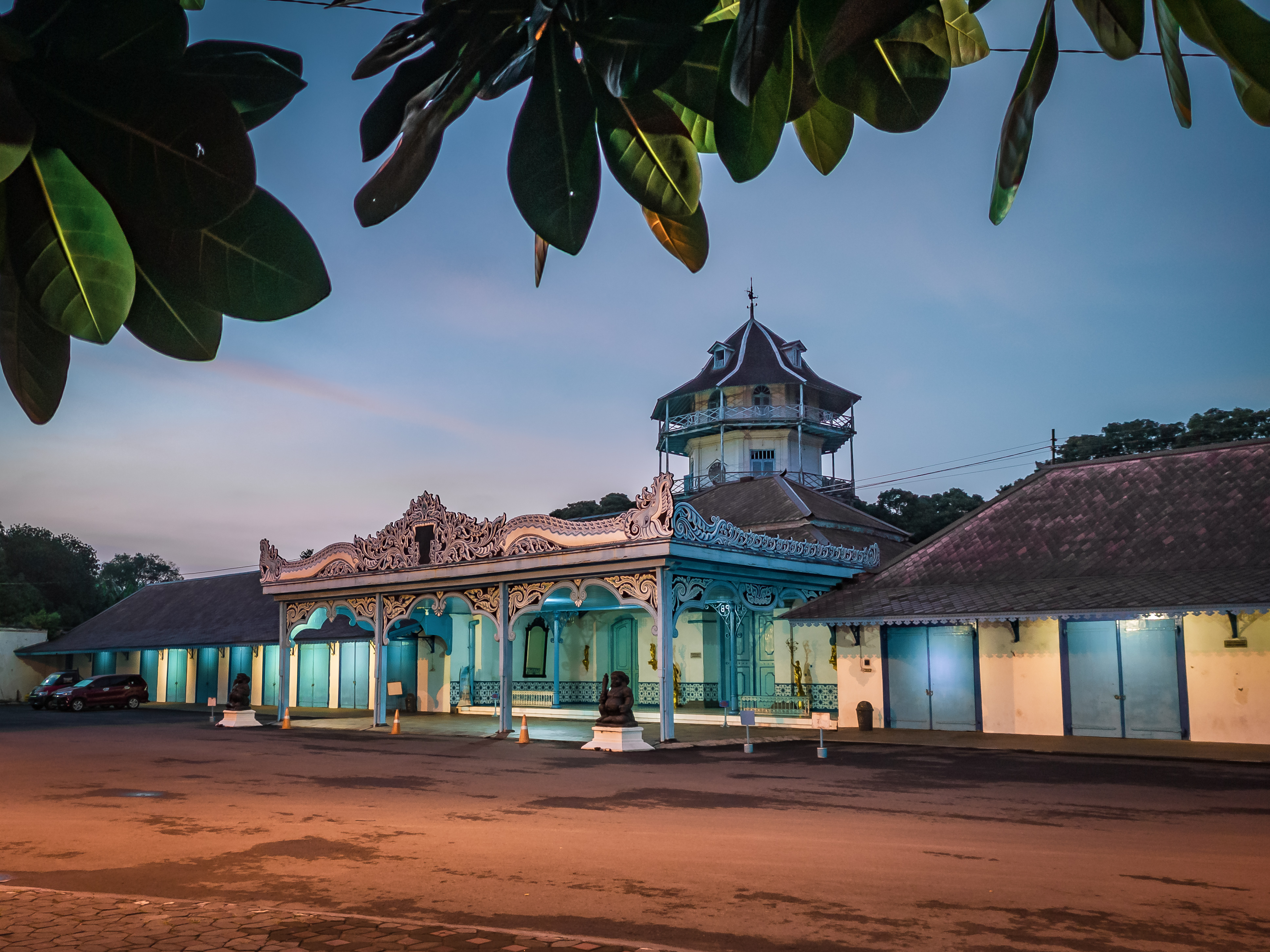
Kraton Surakarta Hadiningrat or Surakarta Royal Palace, seat of Sunanate of Surakarta in Surakarta.

=== Presidential palaces ===
- Gedung Agung, The Presidential Palace in Yogyakarta.
- Istana Bogor, The Presidential Palace in Bogor.
- Istana Cipanas, The President's Leisure Palace in Puncak.
- Istana Merdeka, Jakarta, The President Official Residence.
- Istana Negara, Jakarta, The President Office.
- Istana Tampaksiring, The Presidential Palace in Bali.
- Istana Wakil Presiden, Jakarta, The Vice President Office.

=== Royal palaces ===
- Istana Al Mukarramah – seat of Sintang Kingdom, Sintang Regency.
- Istana Al Watzikubillah – seat of Sambas Sultanate, Sambas Regency.
- Istana Amantubillah – seat of Mempawah Kingdom, Mempawah Regency.
- Istana Asahan (Bangunan Bersejarah – Balai Di Ujung Tanjung) – seat of Asahan Sultanate, Tanjungbalai.
- Istana Asi Mbojo – seat of Bima Sultanate, Kota Bima.
- Istana Asseraya Al Hasyimiyah – seat of Siak Sultanate, Siak Regency.
- Istana Bacan – seat of Bacan Sultanate, South Halmahera Regency.
- Istana Bala Kuning – seat of Sumbawa Sultanate, Sumbawa Regency.
- Istana Balla Lompoa – seat of Gowa Sultanate, Gowa Regency.
- Istana Banggai – seat of Banggai Sultanate, Banggai Islands Regency.
- Istana Datu Luwu – seat of Luwu Kingdom, Kota Palopo.
- Istana Gunung Tabur – seat of Gunung Tabur Sultanate, Berau Regency.
- Istana Indragiri – seat of Indragiri Kingdom, Indragiri Hulu Regency.
- Istana Ismahayana – seat of Landak Kingdom, Landak Regency.
- Istana Jailolo – seat of Jailolo Sultanate, North Halmahera Regency.
- Istana Kadriyah – seat of Pontianak Sultanate, Pontianak.
- Istana Kantor – seat of Riau-Lingga Sultanate, Kota Tanjung Pinang.
- Istana Kubu – seat of Kubu Kingdom, Kubu Raya Regency.
- Istana Kuning – seat of Kotawaringin Sultanate, West Kotawaringin Regency.
- Istana Maimun – seat of Deli Sultanate, Medan.
- Istana Malige – seat of Buton Sultanate, Baubau.
- Istana Mori – seat of Mori Kingdom, Morowali Regency.
- Istana Muliakarta – seat of Matan Kingdom, Ketapang Regency.
- Istana Niat – seat of Limalaras Kingdom, Batubara Regency.
- Istana Paku Negara – seat of Tayan Kingdom, Tayan Regency.
- Istana Rokan Hulu – seat of Rokan Hulu Kingdom, Rokan Hulu Regency.
- Istana Sadurangas – seat of Paser Belengkong Sultanate, Paser Regency.
- Istana Sambaliung – seat of Sambaliung Sultanate, Berau Regency.
- Istana Sayap – seat of Pelalawan Sultanate, Pelalawan Regency.
- Istana Serdang – seat of Serdang Sultanate, Serdang Bedagai Regency.
- Istana Siak Sri Indrapura - seat of Siak Sri Indrapura Sultanate
- Istana Surya Negara – seat of Sanggau Kingdom, Sanggau Regency.
- Istana Tanjung Palas – seat of Bulungan Sultanate, Bulungan Regency.
- Istana Ternate – seat of Ternate Sultanate, Ternate.
- Istana Tidore – seat of Tidore Sultanate, Tidore.
- Istana Tunggang Bosar – seat of Dhasa Nawalu Sultanate, South Tapanuli Regency.
- Istano Basa Pagaruyung – seat of Pagaruyung Kingdom, Tanah Datar Regency.
- Istano Kuto Lamo – seat of Palembang Darussalam Sultanate, Palembang.
- Kedaton Kutai Kartanegara – seat of Kutai Kartanegara Sultanate, Kutai Kartanegara Regency.
- Kraton Kacirebonan – seat of Kacirebonan Dynasty of Cirebon Sultanate, Cirebon.
- Kraton Kanoman – seat of Kanoman Dynasty of Cirebon Sultanate, Cirebon.
- Kraton Kasepuhan – seat of Kasepuhan Dynasty of Cirebon Sultanate, Cirebon.
- Kraton Ngayogyakarta Hadiningrat – seat of Yogyakarta Sultanate, Yogyakarta.
- Kraton Sumedang Larang – seat of Sumedang Larang Kingdom, Sumedang Regency.
- Kraton Sumenep – seat of Sumenep (East Madura) Duchy, Sumenep Regency.
- Kraton Surakarta Hadiningrat – seat of the Surakarta Sunanate, Surakarta.
- Pura Pakualaman – seat of Pakualaman Duchy, Yogyakarta.
- Pura Mangkunegaran – seat of Mangkunegaran Duchy, Surakarta.
- Puri Agung Bangli – seat of Bangli Kingdom, Bangli Regency.
- Puri Agung Denpasar – seat of Badung Kingdom, Denpasar.
- Puri Agung Gianyar – seat of Gianyar Kingdom, Gianyar Regency.
- Puri Agung Karangasem – seat of Karangasem Kingdom, Karangasem Regency.
- Puri Agung Klungkung – seat of Klungkung Kingdom, Klungkung Regency.
- Puri Agung Negara – seat of Jembrana Kingdom, Jembrana Regency.
- Puri Agung Singaraja – seat of Buleleng Kingdom, Buleleng Regency.
- Puri Agung Tabanan – seat of Tabanan Kingdom, Tabanan Regency.
- Puri Agung Ubud – seat of Ubud Princedom, Gianyar Regency.
- Saoraja La Pinceng – seat of Balusu Kingdom, Barru Regency.
- Saoraja Mallangga – seat of Wajo Sultanate, Wajo Regency.
- Saoraja Petta Ponggawae – seat of Bone Sultanate, Bone Regency.
- Sonaf Ba'a – seat of Rote Kingdom, Rote Ndao Regency.
- Sonaf Baun – seat of Amarasi Kingdom, Kupang.
- Sonaf Larantuka – seat of Larantuka Kingdom, East Flores Regency.
- Sonaf Nisnoni – seat of Kupang Kingdom, Kupang.
- Sonaf Oelolok – seat of Taolin Kingdom, North Central Timor Regency.
- Sonaf Sonbesi – seat of Amanuban Kingdom, South Central Timor Regency.

== Iran ==
=== Palaces and pavilions ===
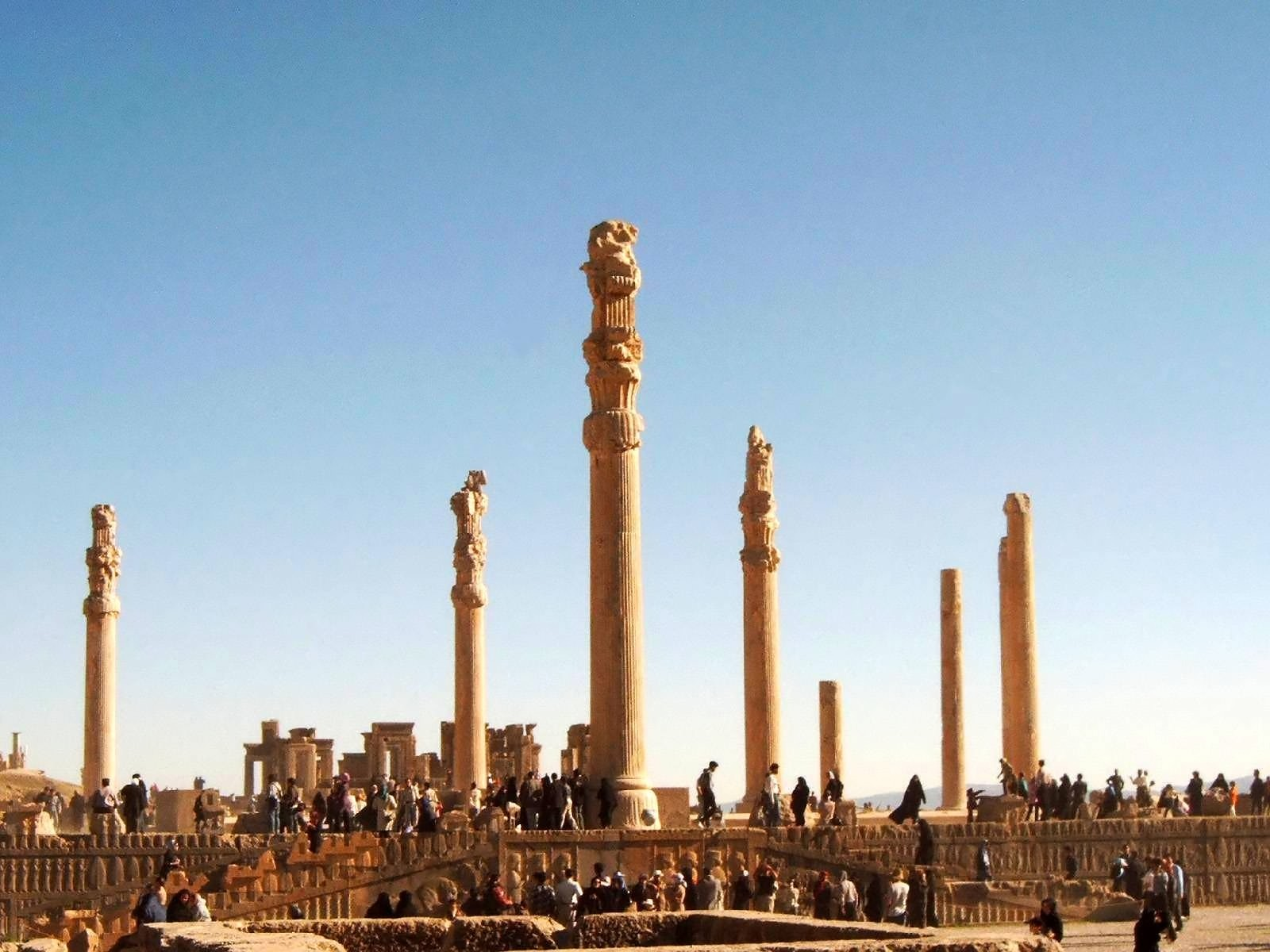
The ruins of Apadana palace in Persepolis (built 2500 years ago during the reign of the Achaemenid Empire)

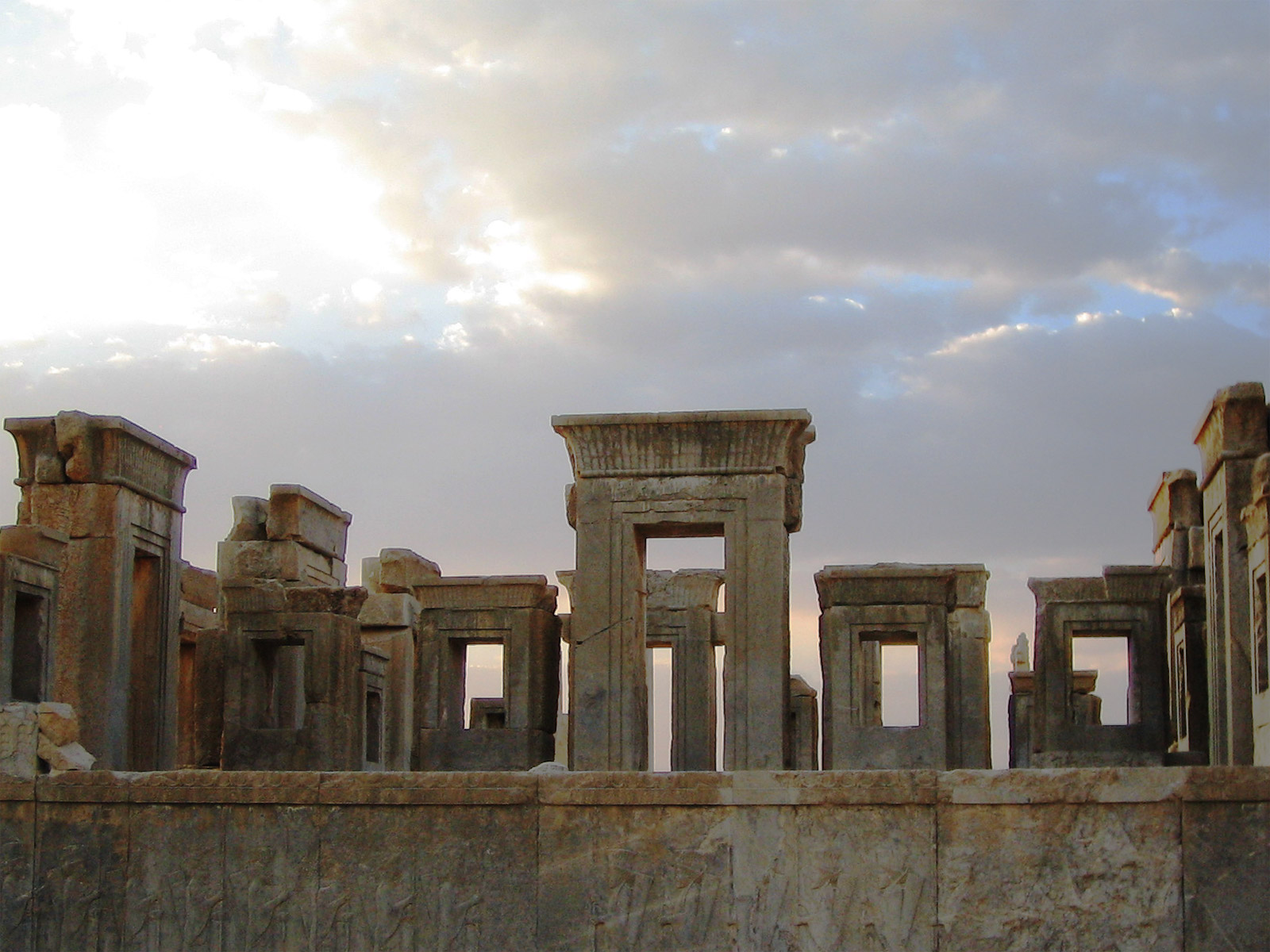
The ruins of Tachara palace in Persepolis (exclusive palace of Darius the Great, one of the interior palaces in Persepolis)

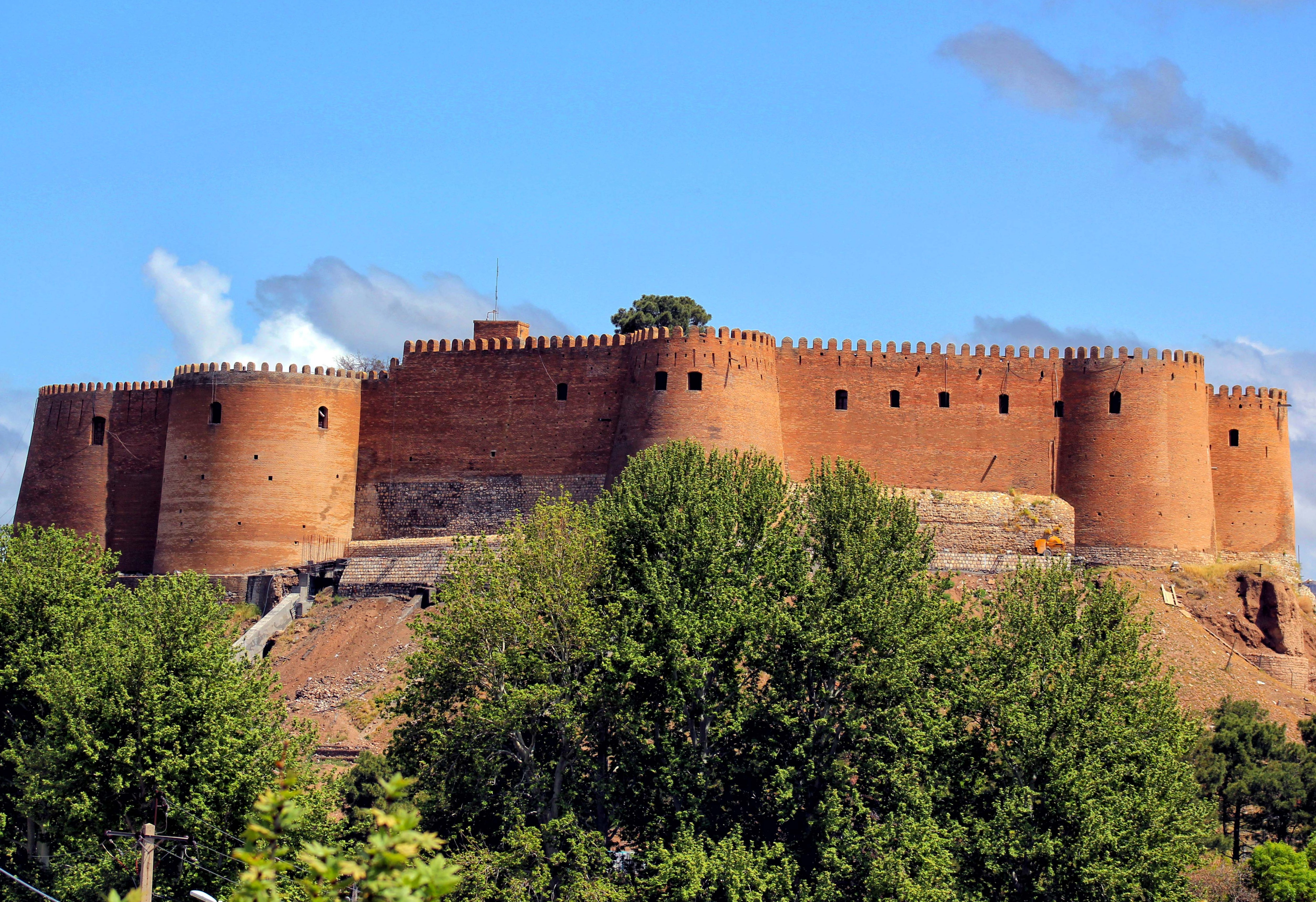
Falak-ol-Aflak Castle, Khorramabad

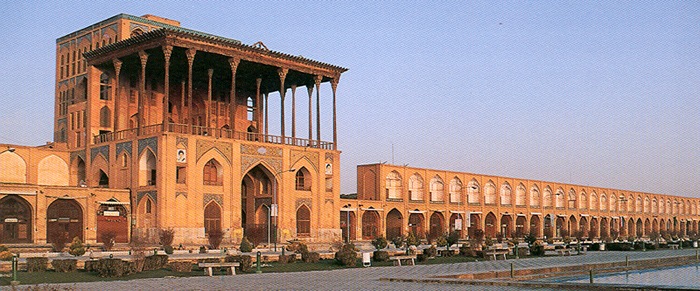
Ali Qapu in Isfahan

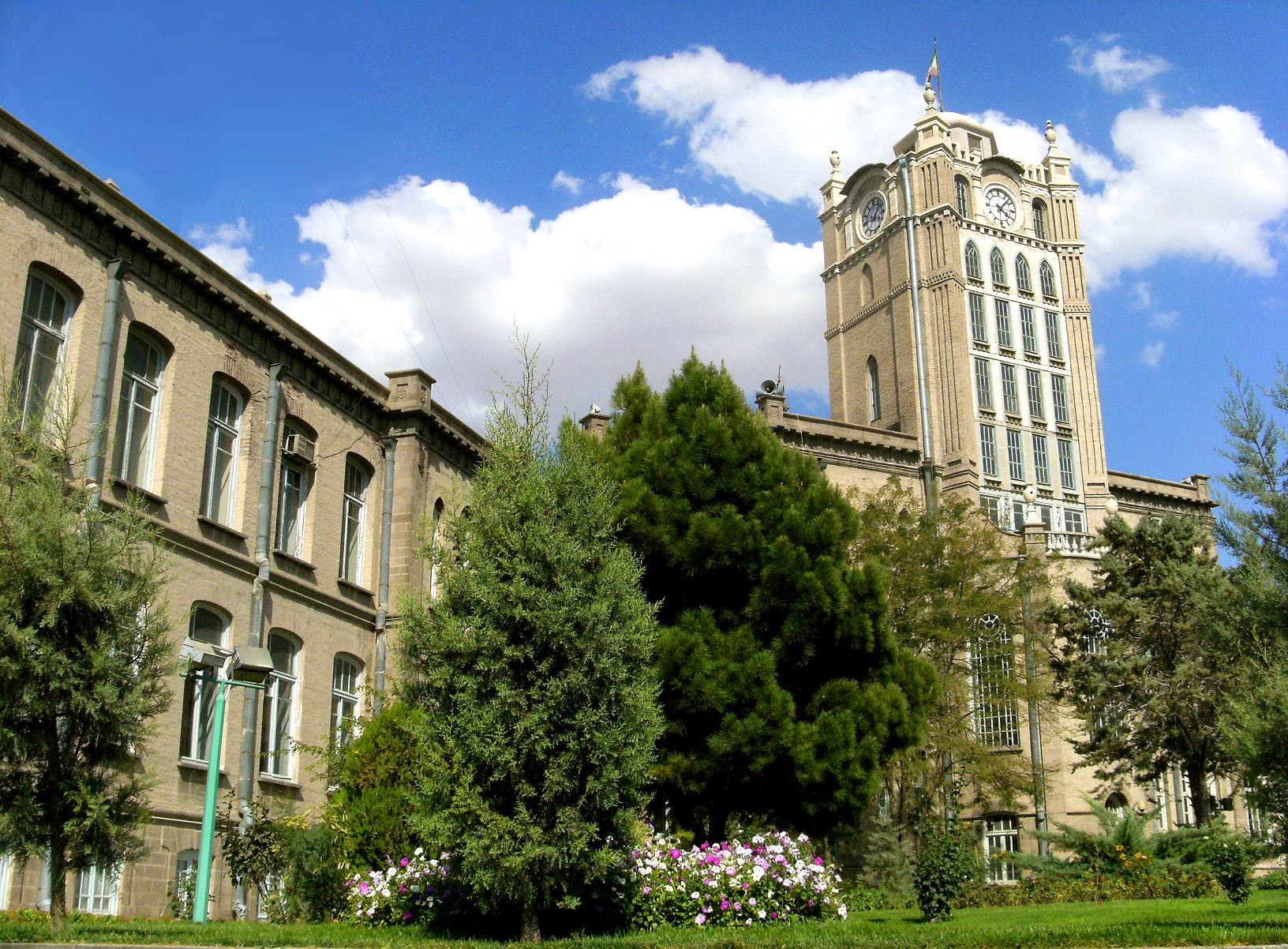
Tabriz Municipality Palace

- Ali Qapu, former residence of the Safavid dynasty after Abbas the Great, in Isfahan
- Apadana in Persepolis
- Baharestan Palace in Tehran
- Baqcheh Jooq Palace near Maku
- Chehel Sotoun in Isfahan
- Chehel Sotoun of Qazvin in Qazvin
- East Azerbaijan Governance Palace in Tabriz
- Ferdows Garden in Tehran
- Gate of All Nations in Persepolis
- Golestan Palace, former residence of the Qajar dynasty, in Tehran
- Hasht Behesht in Isfahan
- Marble Palace in Tehran
- Naseri Palace in Shahrestanak
- Negarestan Palace in Tehran
- Niavaran Complex, former residence of the Qajar and Pahlavi dynasties
- Palace of Ardashir in Firuzabad, south of Shiraz
- Ramsar Palace, summer residence of the Pahlavi dynasty
- Ruby Palace in Tehran
- Sa'dabad Complex in Tehran, former residence of the Pahlavi dynasty
- Sahebgharaniyeh Palace, where Naser al-Din Shah Qajar lived, in Tehran
- Shams-ol-Emareh in Tehran
- Soleymaniyeh Palace in Karaj
- Tabriz Municipality Palace, the head office of the municipal government of Tabriz
- Tachara, one of the interior palaces in Persepolis
- Takht-e Soleymān in West Azerbaijan
- Throne Hall, second largest palace of Persepolis after the Apadana
- Tehran Municipality Palace, which was located on the north side of Toopkhaneh

=== Castles and citadels ===
- Alamut Castle, a mountain fortress in Gilan province
- Arg-e Bam in Bam
- Arg-e Furg in South Khorasan
- Arg-e Karim Khan in Shiraz
- Arg-e Nehbandan in Birjand
- Arg-e Ryan in Kerman
- Arg-e Tabriz in Tabriz
- Arg-e Tus in Tus
- Arshoq Castle in Meshginshahr
- Babak Fort on top of a mountain in the Arasbaran forests
- Falak-ol-Aflak in Khorramabad
- Fort Nossa Senhora da Conceição in Hormuz Island
- Qal'eh Dokhtar in Kerman
- Markooh Fortress in Ramsar
- Meimoon Castle in Qazvin
- Naryn Castle in Yazd Province
- Rudkhan Castle, a brick and stone medieval castle in Gilan Province
- Shush Castle in Hormuz Island

== Iraq ==
- Republican Palace
- Al Salam Palace (Baghdad, Iraq)
- Al-Faw Palace
- Radwaniyah Palace
- Assyria Palace
- Taq Kasra

== Israel ==
- House of the Forest of Lebanon
- Herod's Palace (Jerusalem)
- Herodium
- Tower of David

== Italy ==
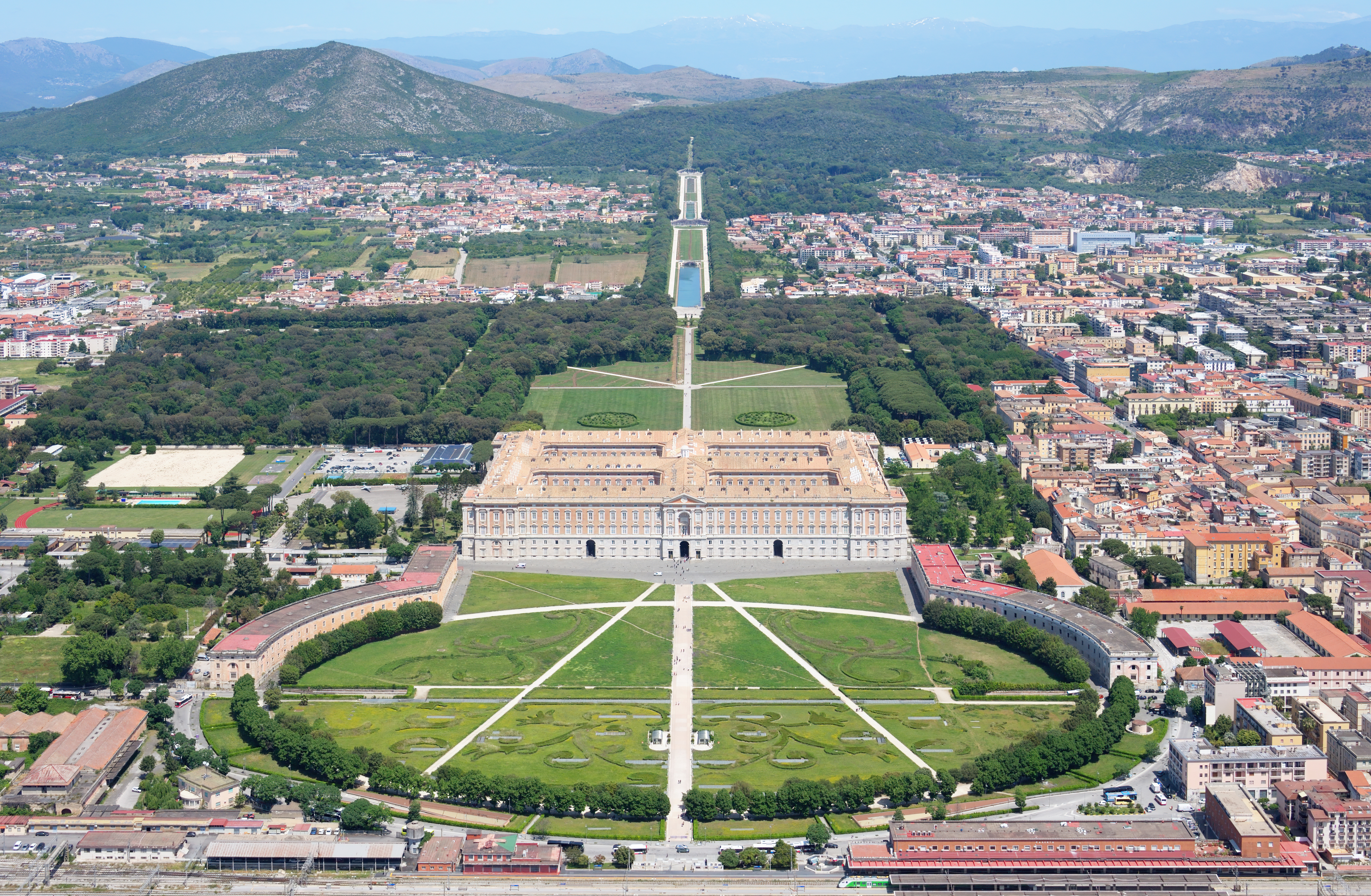
Aerial view of the Royal Palace of Caserta

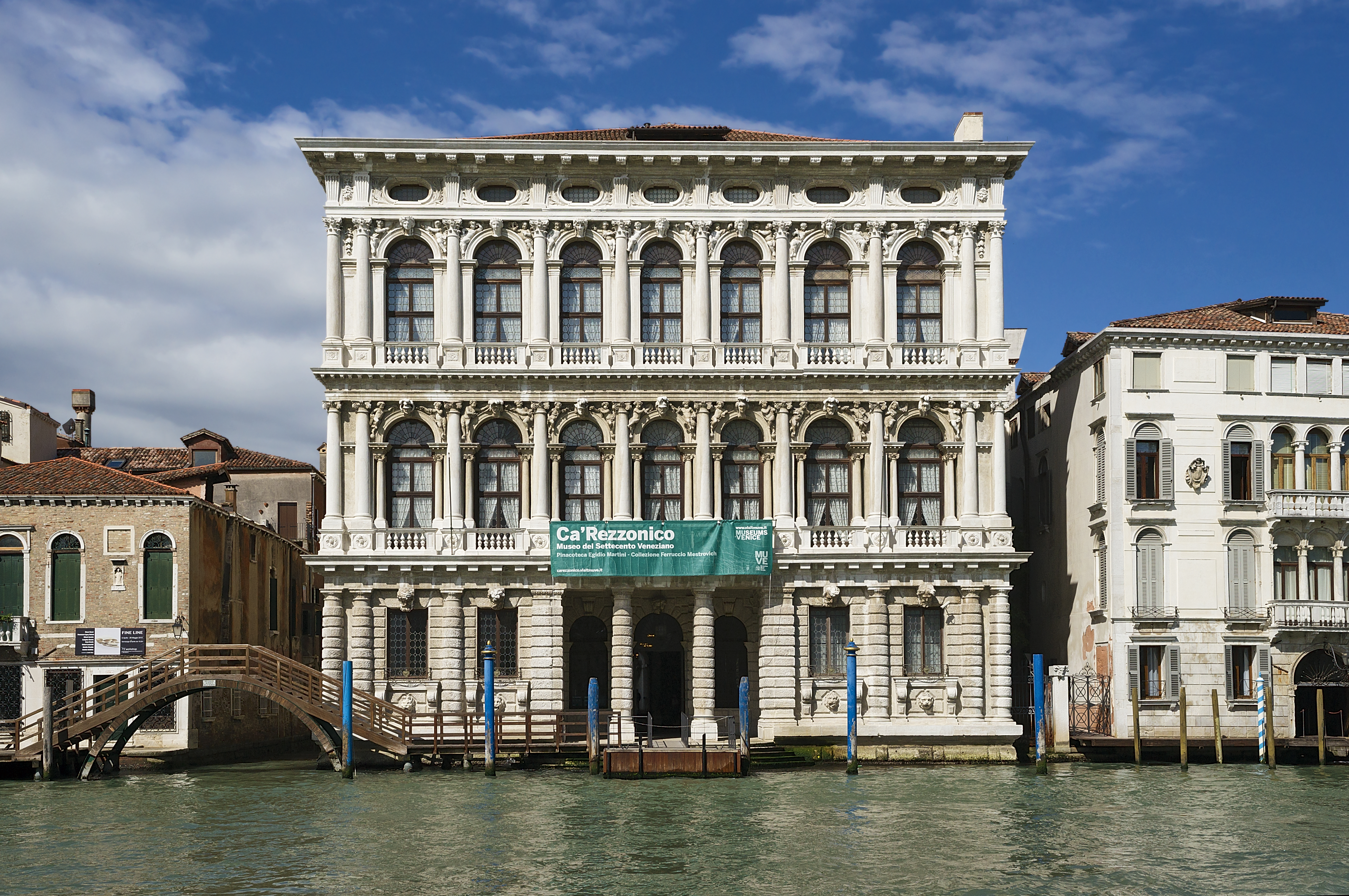
Ca' Rezzonico, Venice

=== Rome ===
- Palazzo Altemps
- Palazzo Barberini – It houses Galleria Nazionale d'Arte Antica
- Palazzo Borghese
- Palazzo Colonna
- Palazzo Corsini – office of the Accademia dei Lincei
- Palazzo della Cancelleria – former papal palace
- Palazzo della Civiltà Italiana – Also known as 'Colosseo Quadrato' in EUR
- Palazzo dei Conservatori
- Palazzo di Venezia – former the Embassy of the Republic of Venice
- Palazzo Doria Pamphilj
- Palazzo Farnese – now the French Embassy in Italy
- Palazzo Laterano – former papal residence, currently the seat of Diocese of Rome
- Palazzo Madama – currently House of the Italian Senate
- Palazzo Montecitorio – currently Lower House of Italian Parliament
- Palazzo Quirinale – Presidential Palace, former residence of the kings of Italy
- Palazzo Spada

=== Florence ===
- Bargello – Also known as the Palazzo del Popolo
- Palazzo Medici
- Palazzo Pitti – former seat of the Grand Duke of Tuscany
- Palazzo Rucellai
- Palazzo Strozzi
- Palazzo Uffizi
- Palazzo Vecchio – City Hall of Firenze

=== Venice ===
- Ca' d'Oro
- Ca' Foscari
- Ca' Rezzonico
- Ca' Vendramin Calergi – now home of the Wagner Museum and Venice Casino
- Doge's Palace – former seat of the Doge of Venice
- Palazzo Barbarigo
- Palazzo Contarini del Bovolo
- Palazzo Dandolo
- Palazzo Grassi
- Palazzo Labia – now the regional HQ of RAI (Radiotelevisione Italiana)
- Palazzo Malipiero
- Palazzo Venier dei Leoni – now the Peggy Guggenheim Collection

=== Elsewhere ===
- Palazzo Re Enzo, Bologna
- Palazzo del Podestà, Bologna
- Palazzo dei Notai, Bologna
- Royal Palace of Caserta, Caserta (near Napoli) – former seat of the kings of Two Sicilies
- Papal Palace, Castel Gandolfo – Summer residence of the Pope
- Palazzo dei Diamanti, Ferrara – currently houses 'Pinacoteca Nazionale'
- Palazzo Bianco, Genoa
- Torre e Palazzo de Félice, Rosciano – an 11th-century castle and former ancestral palace of the Counts di Panzutti of the de Félice family
- Palazzo de Felice, Somma Vesuviana – a 16th-century palace of the Counts di Panzutti of the De Felice family
- Palazzo de Felice, Grottaglie – an 18th-century palace of the Counts di Panzutti of the de Felice family
- Palazzo Pfanner, Lucca
- Palazzo del Te, Mantua – former seat of the Dukes of Mantua
- Palazzo Litta, Milan
- Castello Sforzesco, Milan – residence of the dukes of Milan
- Royal Villa of Monza, Monza
- Ducal Palace, Modena – residence of the dukes of Modena
- Royal Palace, Naples
- Royal Palace of Capodimonte, Naples – Summer palace of the kings of the Two Sicilies; today home to Museo di Capodimonte
- Palazzo dei Normanni, Palermo – former residence of Holy Roman Emperors and kings of Sicily
- Ducal Palace, Parma – residence of the dukes of Parma
- Ducal Palace of Colorno, Colorno
- Palazzo della Carovana, Pisa
- Palace of Portici, Portici
- Palazzo Pubblico, Siena
- Royal Palace of Turin, Torino – former residence of the dukes of Savoy and kings of Sardinia
- Palazzina di Stupinigi, Torino
- Palazzo Carignano, Torino
- Castello del Valentino, Torino
- Palazzo Ducale, Urbino – former seat of the Dukes of Urbino
- Palazzo Canossa, Verona
- Palazzo Chiericati, Vicenza
- Miramare Castle, Trieste
- Royal Palace of Carditello, near Caserta – hunting site and then a farm by of the kings of the Two Sicilies
- Palazzo Ferrari Sacchini, Piacenza

== Japan ==
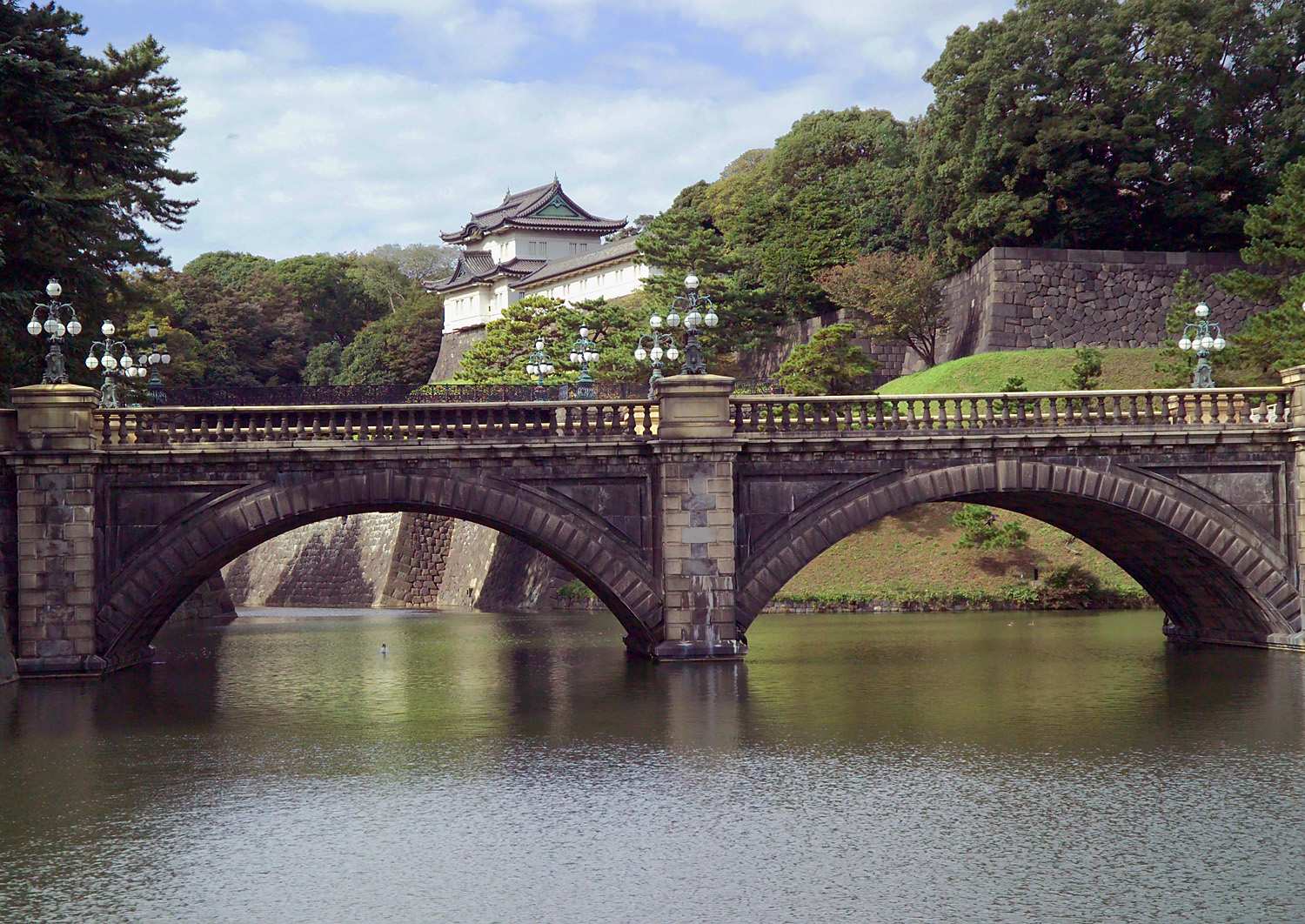
View on Seimon Ishibashi and moat of Imperial Palace, Tokyo

- Akasaka Palace (State Guest-House: 迎賓館), Tokyo & Kyoto
- Fukiage Omiya Palace – Imperial residence of the Empress Dowager, Tokyo
- Heijo Palace (平城京) – former capital, Nara
- Heian Palace, Kyoto
- Imperial Palace (皇居) – Imperial Court and Residence, Tokyo
- Katsura Detached Palace (Katsura Imperial Villa: 桂離宮) – former imperial palace, Kyoto
- Kyoto Imperial Palace (京都御所), Kyoto
- Kyoto Omiya Palace – Imperial residence, Kyoto
- Sento Imperial Palace – Imperial residence, Kyoto
- Shugaku-in Detached Palace (Shugaku-in Imperial Villa) – former imperial palace, Kyoto
- Rokuhara Yakata (六波羅館) and Nishihachijo House (西八条邸) – former residence of Taira no Kiyomori, Kyoto.
- Yukimi Imperial Palace (雪見御所) – former residence of Taira no Kiyomori, Fukuhara-kyō.
- Yanagi no Gosho (柳之御所) – former residence of Northern Fujiwara, Hiraizumi, Iwate.
- Kyara Gosho (伽羅御所) – former residence of Northern Fujiwara, Hiraizumi, Iwate.
- Okura Imperial Palace (大倉御所) – former residence of Kamakura shogunate.
- Utsunomiya Zushi Imperial Palace (宇都宮辻子御所) – former residence of Kamakura shogunate.
- Wakamiya Oji Imperial Palace (若宮大路御所) – former residence of Kamakura shogunate.
- Sanjo Bomon Dono (三条坊門殿) – former residence of Ashikaga shogunate, Kyoto.
- Hana no-gosho (花の御所) – former residence of Ashikaga shogunate, Kyoto.
- Azuchi Castle (安土城) – former residence of Oda Nobunaga, Ōmihachiman, Shiga Prefecture.
- Osaka Castle (大坂城) – former residence of Kampaku Toyotomi Hideyoshi, Osaka.
- Jurakudai (聚楽第) – former residence of Kampaku Toyotomi Hideyoshi, Kyoto.
- Edo Castle (江戶城) – former residence of Tokugawa shogunate, Tokyo.
- Nijō Castle (二条城) – former palace, Kyoto
- Shuri Castle (首里城) – former seat of the Kings of Ryūkyū, Naha

== Jordan ==
Raghadan Palace, Amman. Royal Residence of the Hussein Family

== Korea ==
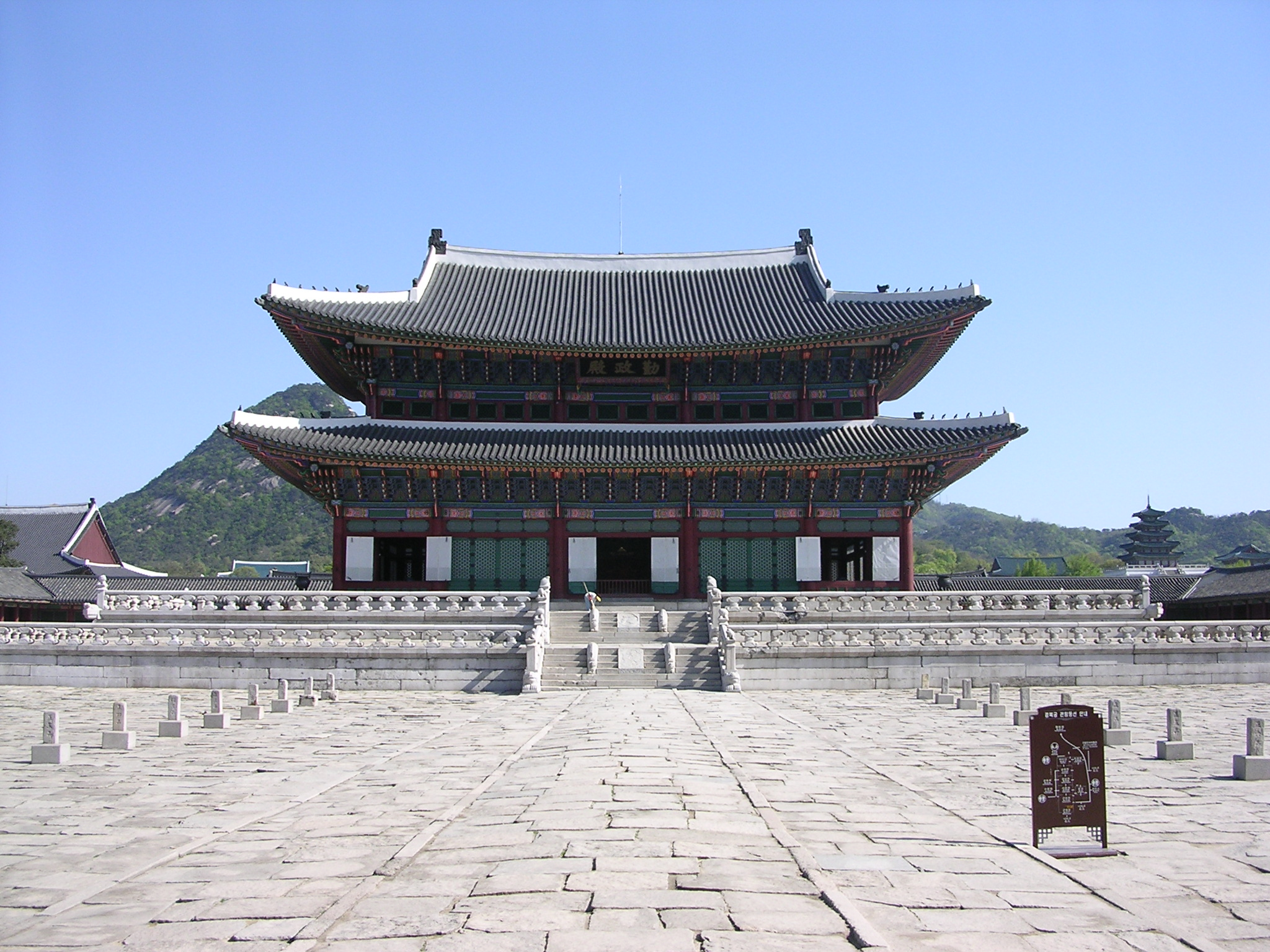
Gyeongbok Palace, Seoul

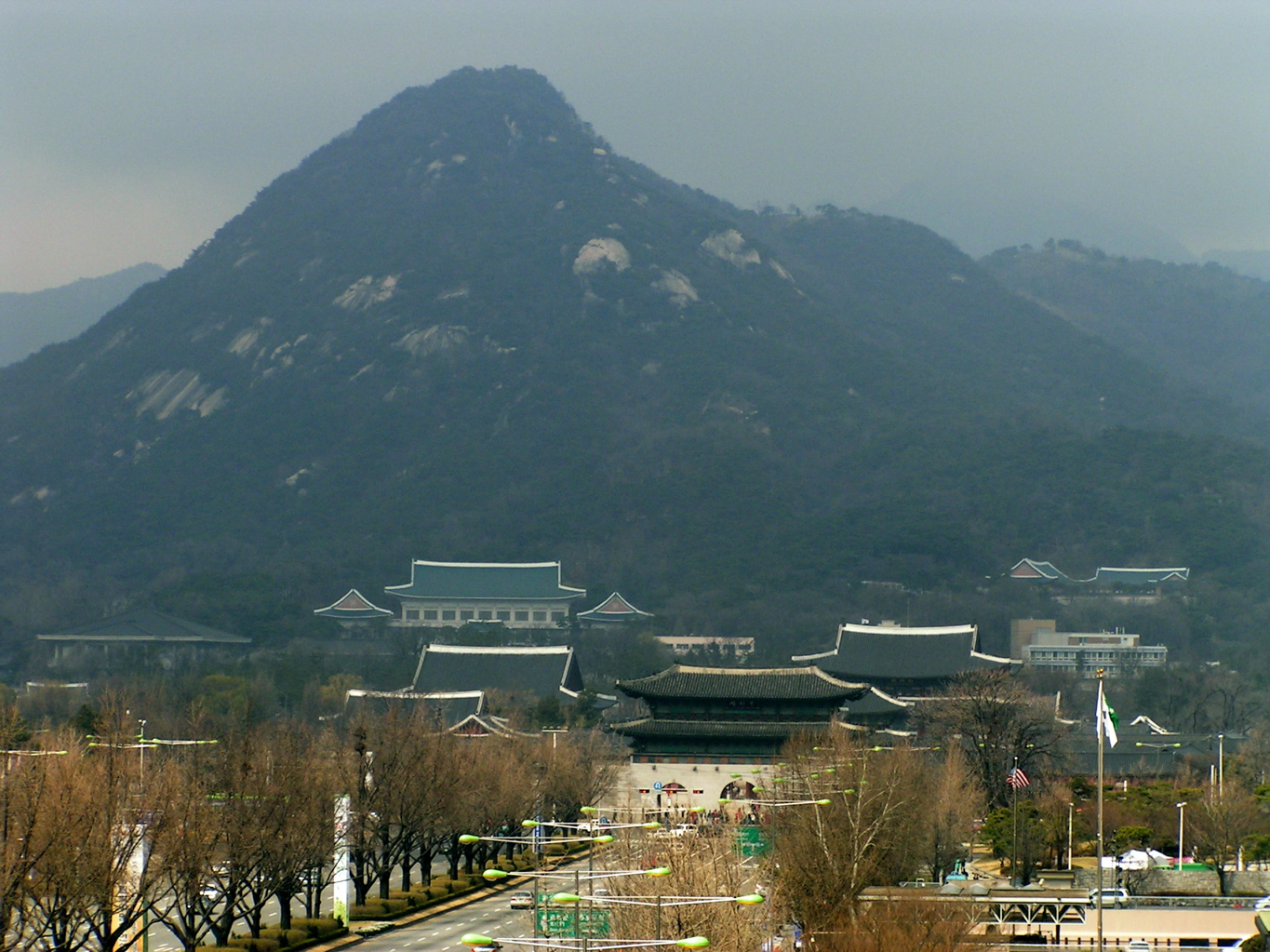
Gyeongbok Palace and the Blue House, Seoul

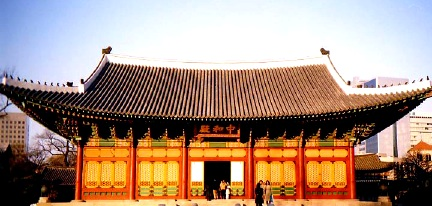
Deoksu Palace, Seoul

- Goguryeo
  - Anhak Palace, Pyeongyang
  - Palace site, Jian, Jilin
- Baekje
  - Palace site, Buyeo
  - Palace site, Gongju
  - Wanggungli site, Iksan
- Silla
  - Eastern Palace, Gyeongju
  - Banwolseong, Gyeongju
- Balhae
  - Palace site, Ning'an
- Taebong
  - Palace site, Cheolwon
  - Seoul
    - Cheon Won Palace
- Goryeo
  - Manwoldae, Main royal palace, Kaesong
  - Suchang Palace, Kaesong
  - Yeongyeong Palace, Kaesong
  - Goryeo Palace, Ganghwa
- Joseon and Korean Empire
  - Gyeongbokgung, Main royal palace, Seoul
  - Changdeokgung, Seoul
  - Changgyeonggung, Seoul
  - Deoksugung, Seoul
  - Gyeonghuigung, Seoul
  - Hwaseong Haenggung Palace, Suwon
  - Namhansan Haenggung Palace, Gwangju
  - Bukhansan Haenggung Palace, Goyang

== Kuwait ==
- Seif Palace – the official residence of the head of state
- Bayan Palace
- Al Salam Palace – Currently a Museum
- Kuwait Red Palace – Currently a Museum
- Dasman Palace – Established in 1904, Sheikh Ahmed Al-Sabah, the tenth ruler of Kuwait in 1930 made it his official residence, It is currently one of Kuwait's historic palaces.
- Mishref Palace – Located in Mishref and was Built by Sheikh Mubarak Al-Sabah in 1900, it was restored in the early 1940s.
- Naif Palace – built In 1919, during the reign of Sheikh Salem Al-Mubarak Al-Sabah. It is currently the Building of Al Asimah Governorate.

== Laos ==
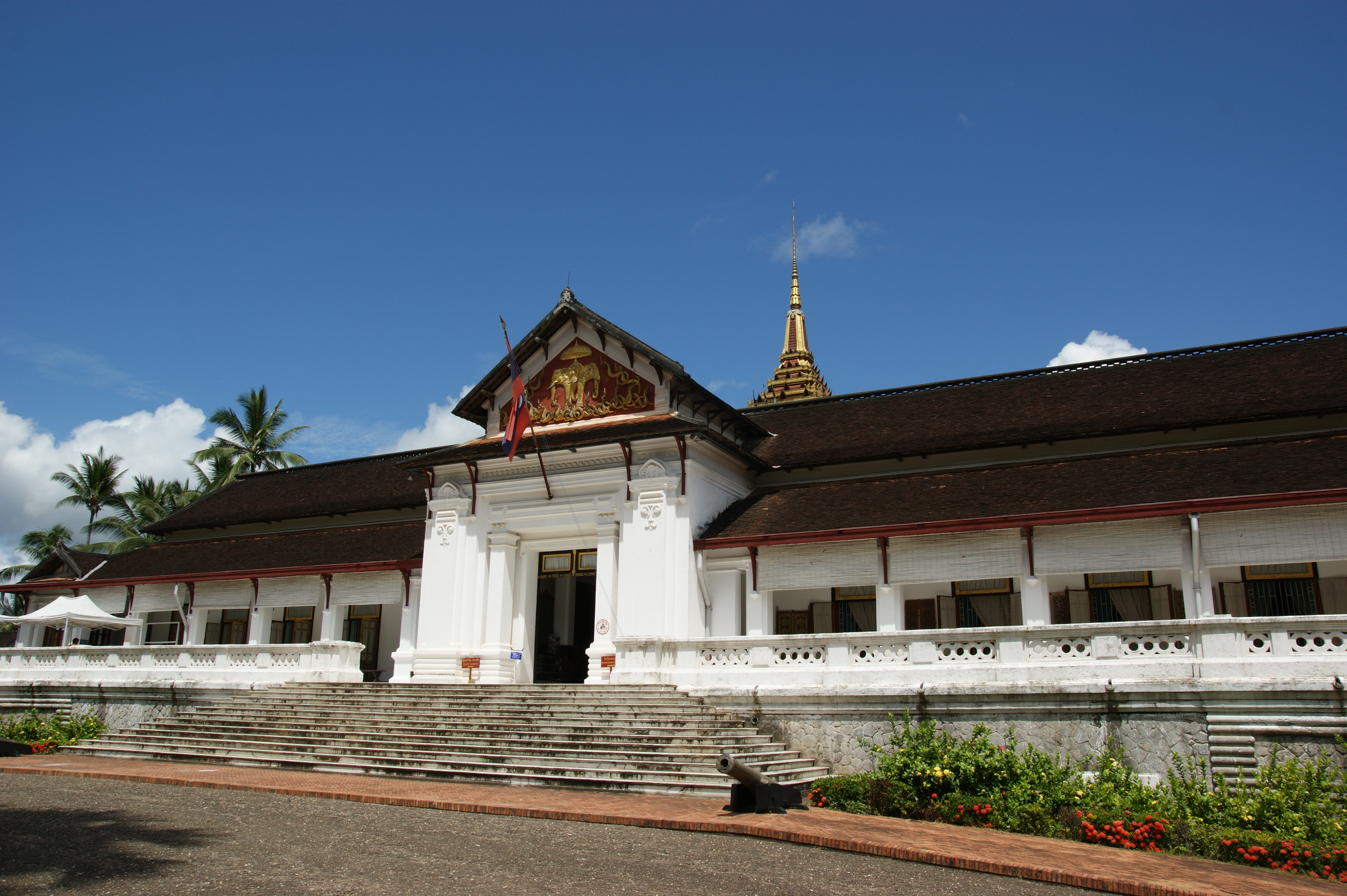

- Royal Palace (Royal Palace) – former residence of Lao royal family, Luang Prabang
- Haw Kham (Presidential Palace) – former residence of President of the Lao People's Democratic Republic, Vientiane

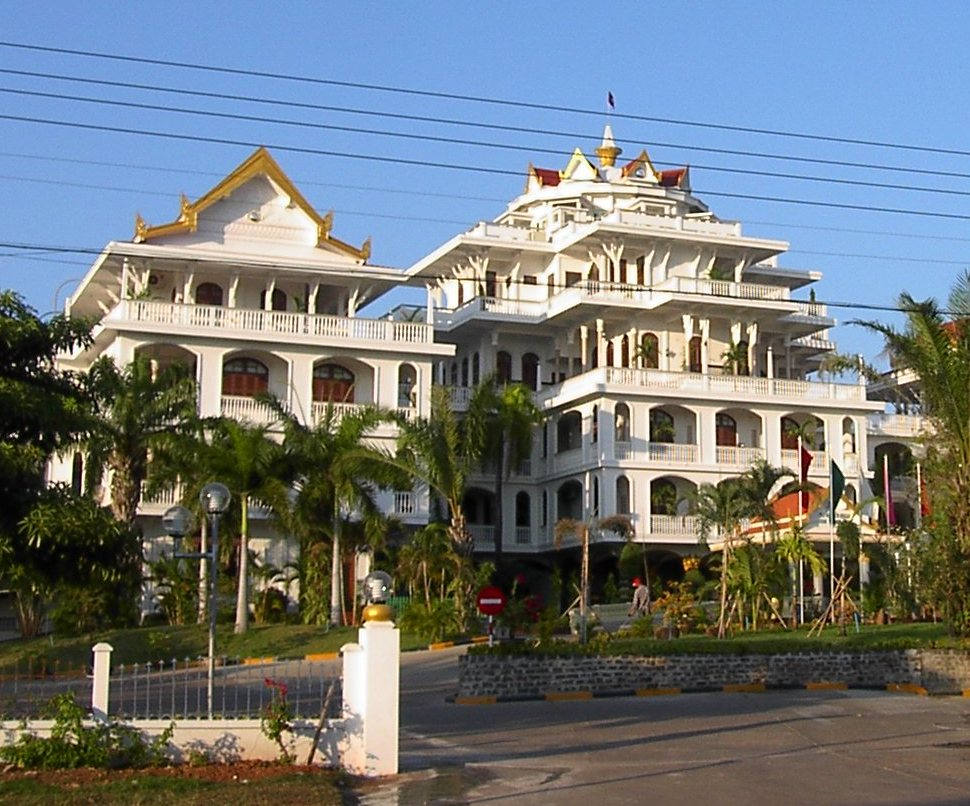

- Champasak Palace (Royal Palace) – former residence of Chao Boun Oum, Pakse

== Latvia ==
- Bīriņi Palace
- Cesvaine Palace
- Cīrava Palace
- Kazdanga Palace
- Krāslava New Palace
- Laidi Palace
- Mežotne Palace
- Mitava Palace of the Dukes of Courland
- Pope Palace
- Preiļi Palace
- Rundale Palace of the Dukes of Courland
- Snēpele Palace
- Stāmeriena Palace
- Varakļāni Palace
- Vērgale Palace

== Lebanon ==
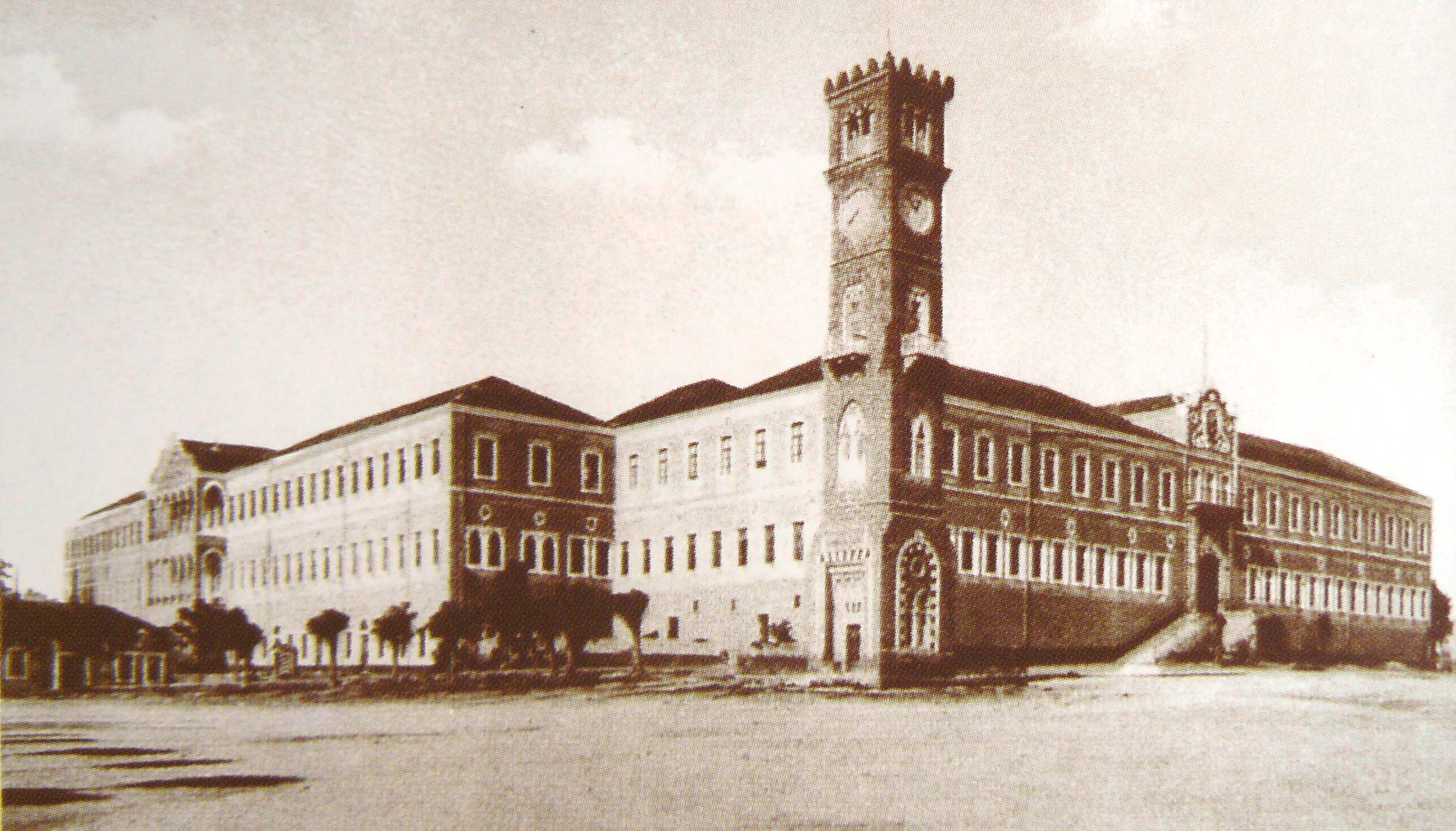
The Grand Serail in Beirut in the late 1800s

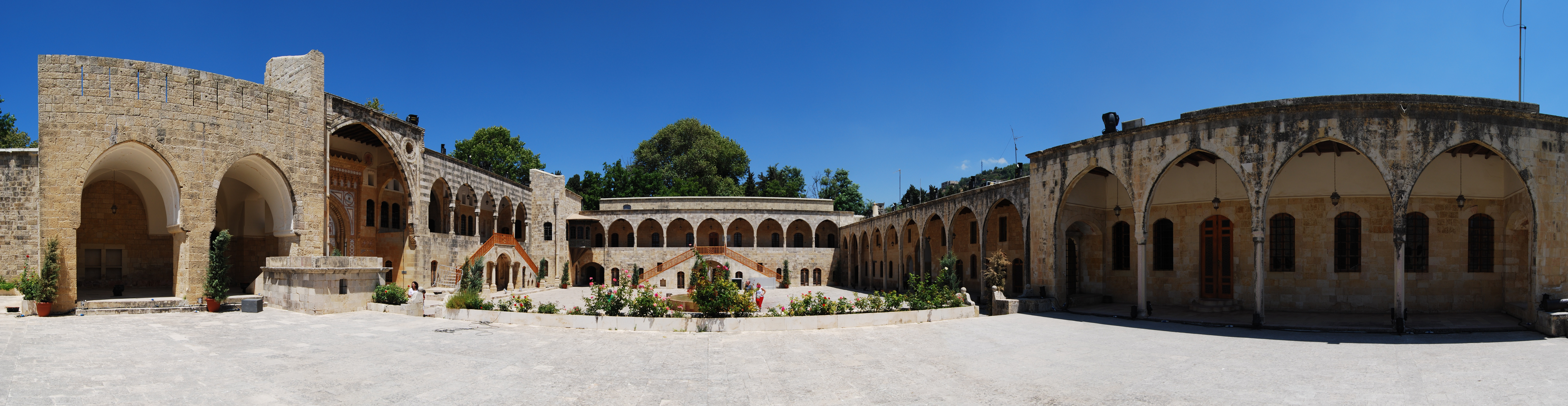
Panoramic view of the Beiteddine Palace

- Baabda Palace (Presidential Palace)
- Beiteddine Palace (Palace of Lebanese Princes until the fall of the Ottoman Empire, Summer presidential residence)
- Bustros Palace (Beirut grand mansion, currently the seat of the Lebanese Ministry of Foreign Affairs)
- Donna Maria Sursock mansion (Aristocratic villa and grounds in Sawfar, damaged during the Lebanese Civil War and the Syrian occupation, now an event venue)
- Fakhreddine Palace (Palace complex of Lebanese Prince Fakhreddine)
- Palace of Emir Ahmad Shihab (18th-century residence in Deir el-Qamar)
- Grand Serail (Prime minister Headquarters)
- Hneineh Palace (Beirut grand mansion, heavily damaged)
- Malhame Palace (Beirut grand mansion, largely defaced, seat of the Lebanese Phalanges party)
- Mir Amin Palace (Currently a luxury hotel)
- Moussa Sursock palace (Beirut grand mansion and landmark)
- Petit Serail (Demolished by the French Mandate authorities in 1920)
- Pine Residence (Currently houses the French Embassy in Beirut)
- Debbane Palace (Historical grand mansion in Sidon, now a museum)
- Robert Mouawad Palace (Beirut grand mansion, currently a Museum)
- Seraglio of Baabda (Historical palace, now headquarters of the Mount Lebanon Governorate)
- Shihab Palace in Hadath (Historical palace, now houses the Spanish Embassy in Beirut)
- Alfred Sursock Palace (Beirut grand mansion and grounds, currently a Museum of Modern Art)
- Villa Linda Sursock (Aristocratic mansion, now an event venue)
- Ziade Palace (Beirut grand mansion)

== Lithuania ==
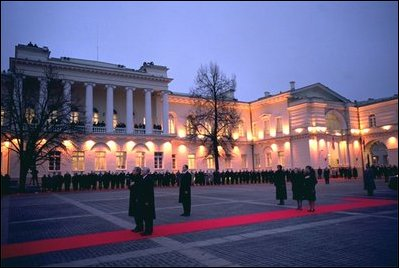
Presidential Palace in Vilnius

- Historical Presidential Palace, Kaunas
- Presidential Palace, Vilnius
- Radziwill Palace, Vilnius
- Royal Palace in Vilnius (being rebuilt)
- Sapieha Palace in Vilnius
- Slushko Palace in Vilnius
- Tiškevičiai Palace, Palanga
- Tyzenhaus Palace in Vilnius
- Trakai Island Castle in Trakai
- Vileišis Palace, Vilnius

== Luxembourg ==
- Grand Ducal Palace, Luxembourg

== Maldives ==
- Etherekoilu, Malé, Maldives
- Us-gēkolhu, Malé, Maldives
- Muliaage, Malé, Maldives

== Mexico ==
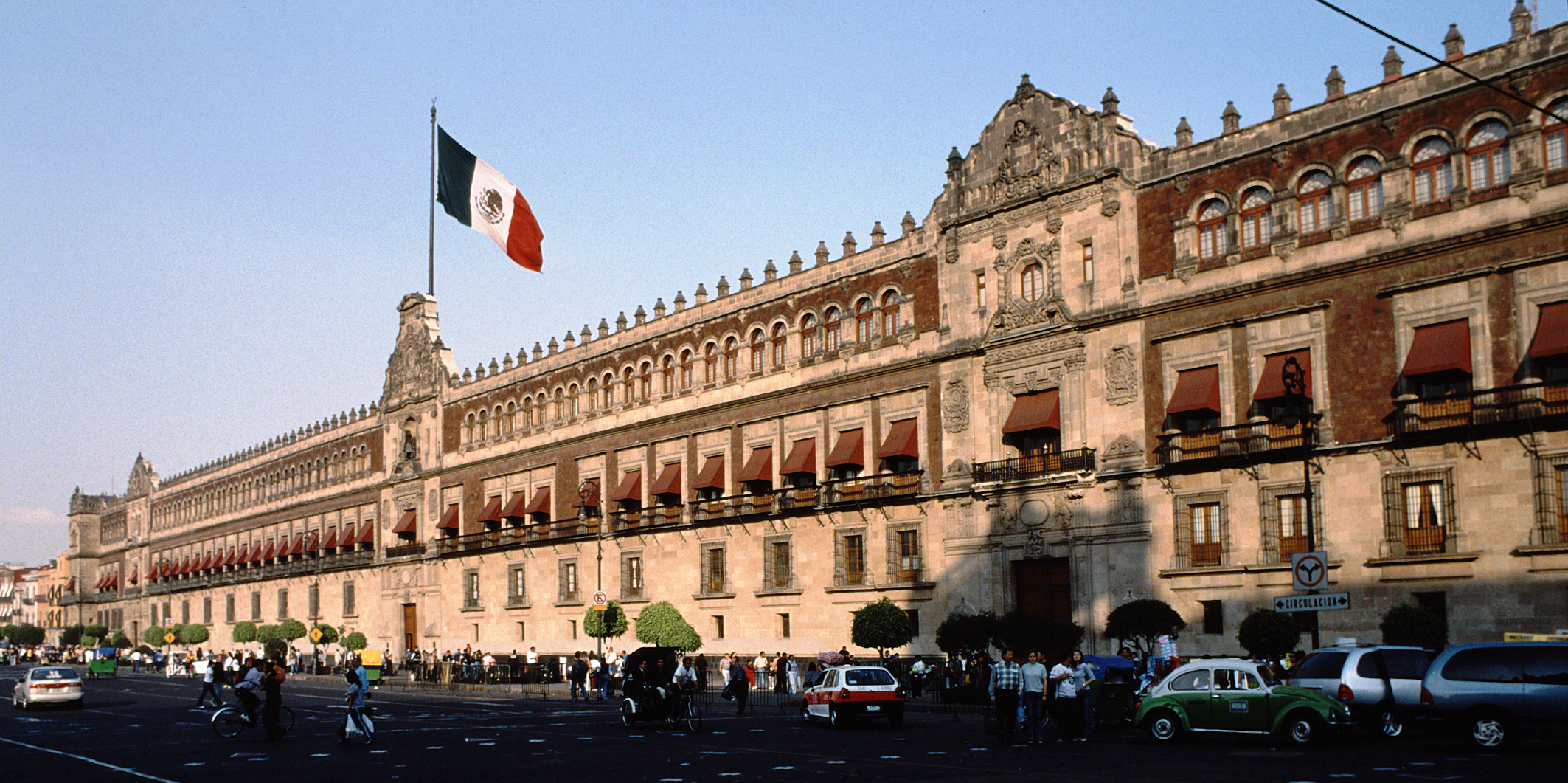
National Palace of Mexico

- Government Palace of Chihuahua, Chihuahua – seat of the Government of the State of Chihuahua
- Palacio de Alvarado, Chihuahua – House of one of the richest silver barons in Mexico.

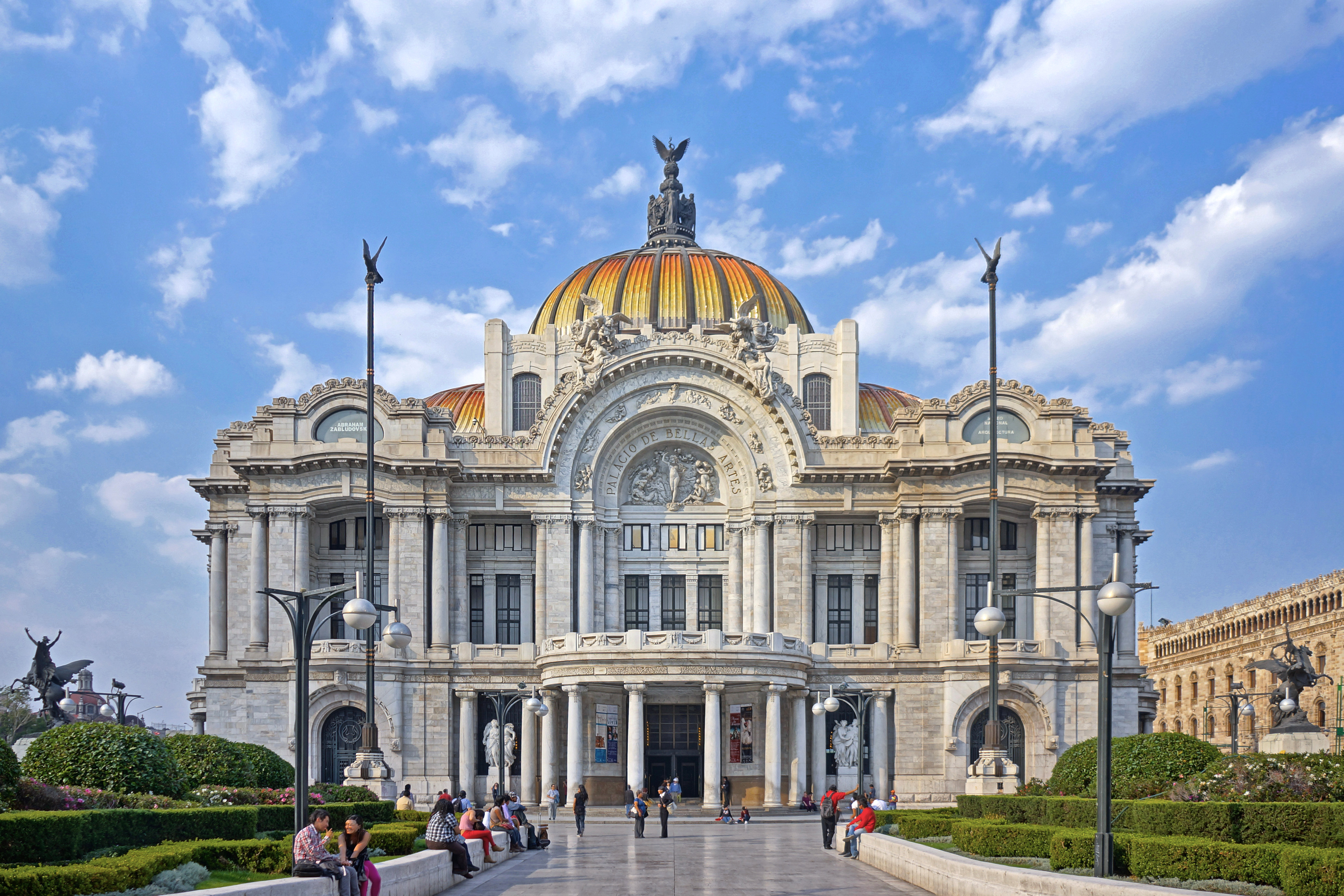
Mexico City's Palace of Fine Arts

- Castillo de Chapultepec, Mexico City – former Imperial residence and Presidential Palace, military academy, and currently, home of the Museo Natural de Historia.
- Palace of San Lázaro, Mexico City – House of the Congress of Mexico.
- Los Pinos Official Residence, Mexico City – official residence of the president of Mexico.
- National Palace, Mexico City – former viceregal and presidential palace; currently serves as the seat of the executive, and houses State ceremonies, such as receptions, banquets, and the Independence celebration.
- Palacio de Bellas Artes, Mexico City
- Palacio de Correos de Mexico, Mexico City
- Palace of Iturbide, Mexico City
- Palacio de Minería, Mexico City
- Museo Nacional del Arte, Mexico City
- Hospicio Cabañas, Guadalajara – Colonial building which housed the city hospital during the Viceroyalty; a UNESCO world heritage site.
- Palace of Government, Monterrey – seat of the Government of Nuevo León.
- Palacio del Obispado, Monterrey
- Castillo de San Juán de Ulúa, Veracruz – former Viceregal and Presidential residence. Later served as a prison. Currently houses a museum.
- Palacio Canton, Mérida – now serves as a museum

== Monaco ==
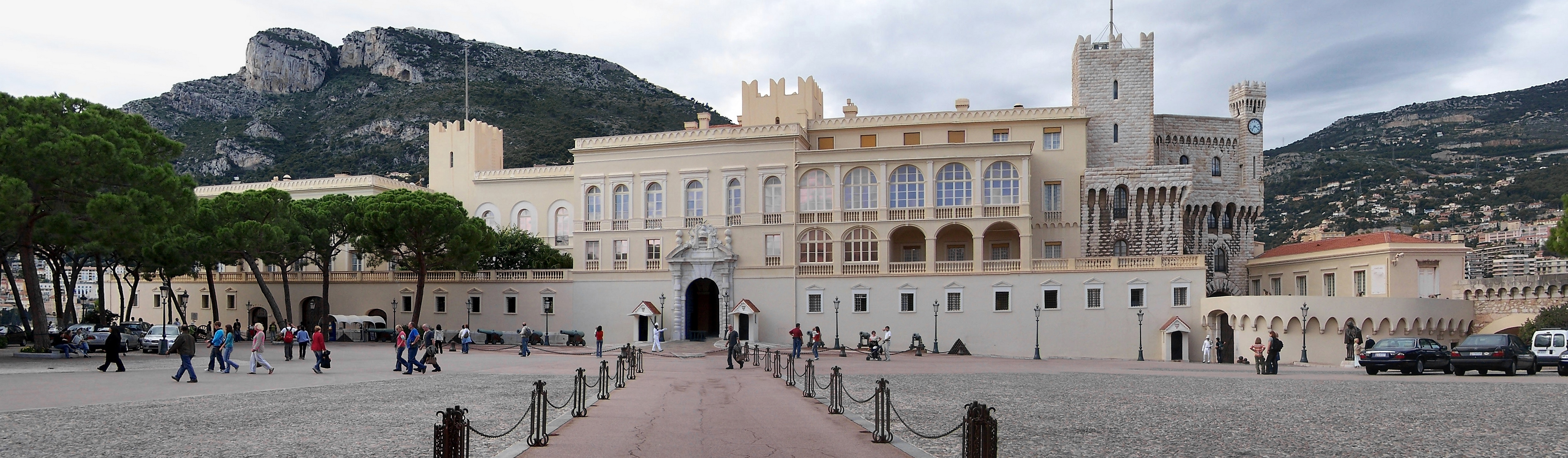
The Princely Palace of Monaco

- The Prince's Palace – seat of the Prince of Monaco

== Mongolia ==
- Brown Palace – imperial residence of the Bogd Khan, Urga
- Green Palace – imperial winter residence of the Bogd Khan, Ulan Bator
- White Palace – imperial residence of the Bogd Khan, Urga
- Yellow Palace – imperial main residence of the Khan, Urga

== Morocco ==
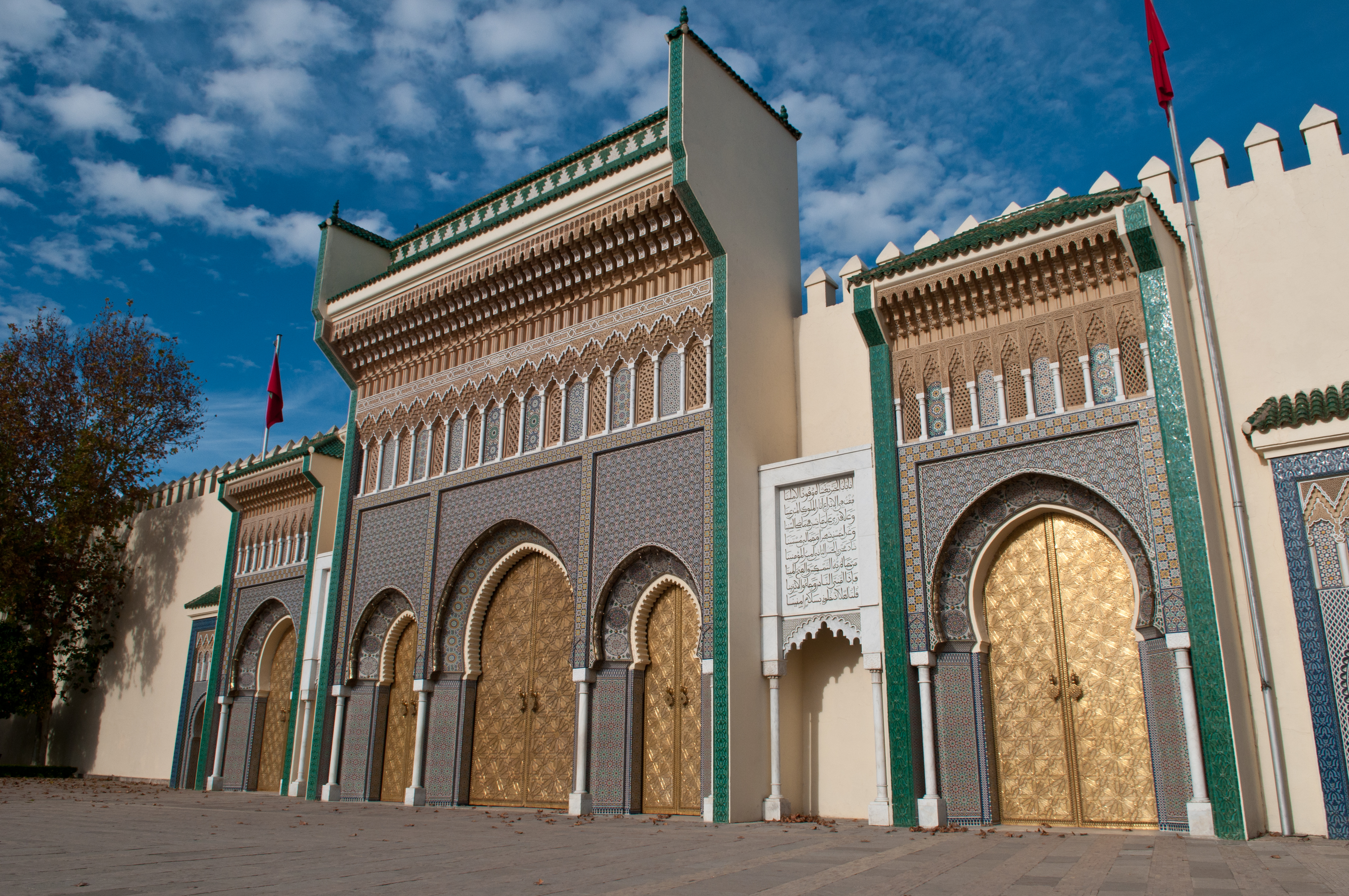
The gates of the Royal Palace in Fez

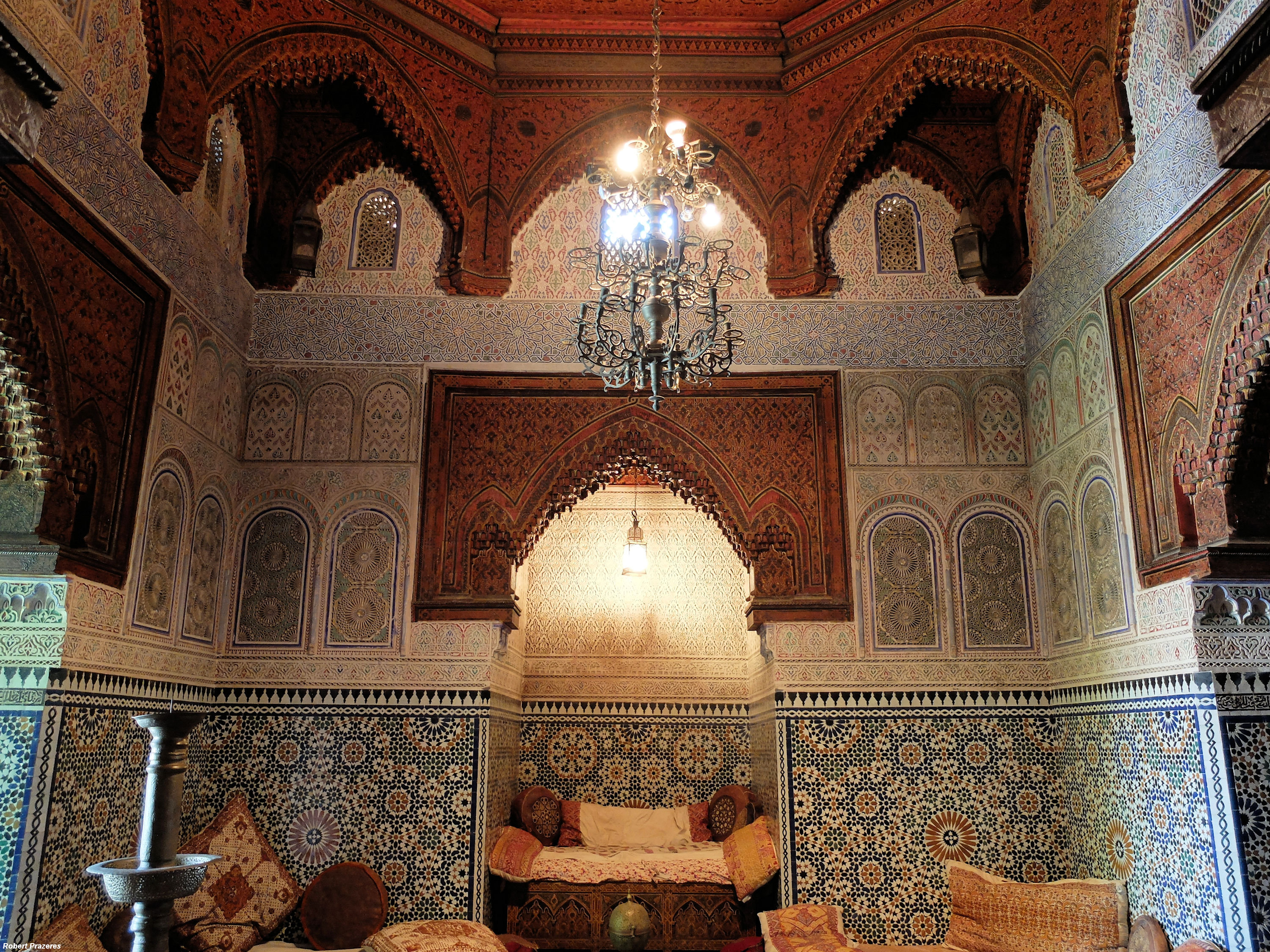
Restored salon in the Dar Jamai in Meknes

- Badi Palace
- Bahia Palace
- Dar Ba Mohammed Chergui
- Dar el Bacha – now a museum
- Dar Batha – now a museum
- Dar Glaoui
- Dar Jamai in Fez – now a hotel
- Dar Jamai in Meknes – now a museum
- Dar al-Makhzen in Fez – Royal Palace
- Dar al-Makhzen in Rabat – Royal Palace
- Dar al-Makhzen in Tangier – former Royal Palace, now a museum
- Dar Mnebhi in Fez
- Dar Mnebhi in Marrakesh – now a museum
- Dar Moqri
- Dar Si Said – now a museum
- Kasbah of Marrakesh – historically a royal citadel, now containing a present-day royal palace and a residential neighbourhood
- Kasbah of Moulay Ismail – built as a vast royal citadel, now containing a present-day royal palace and a mix of neighbourhoods
- Kasbah Taourirt
- Kasbah of Telouet

== Myanmar ==
- Arimadanapura Palace, the former seat of the Pagan Dynasty
- Mya Nan San Kyaw (The Royal Emerald Palace) – former seat of the Konbaung Dynasty, Mandalay
- Kanbawzathadi Palace – The former seat of Bayinnaung
- Mrauk U Palace, the former seat of the Mrauk U based Arakanese Kingdom from 1431 to 1785.

== Nepal ==
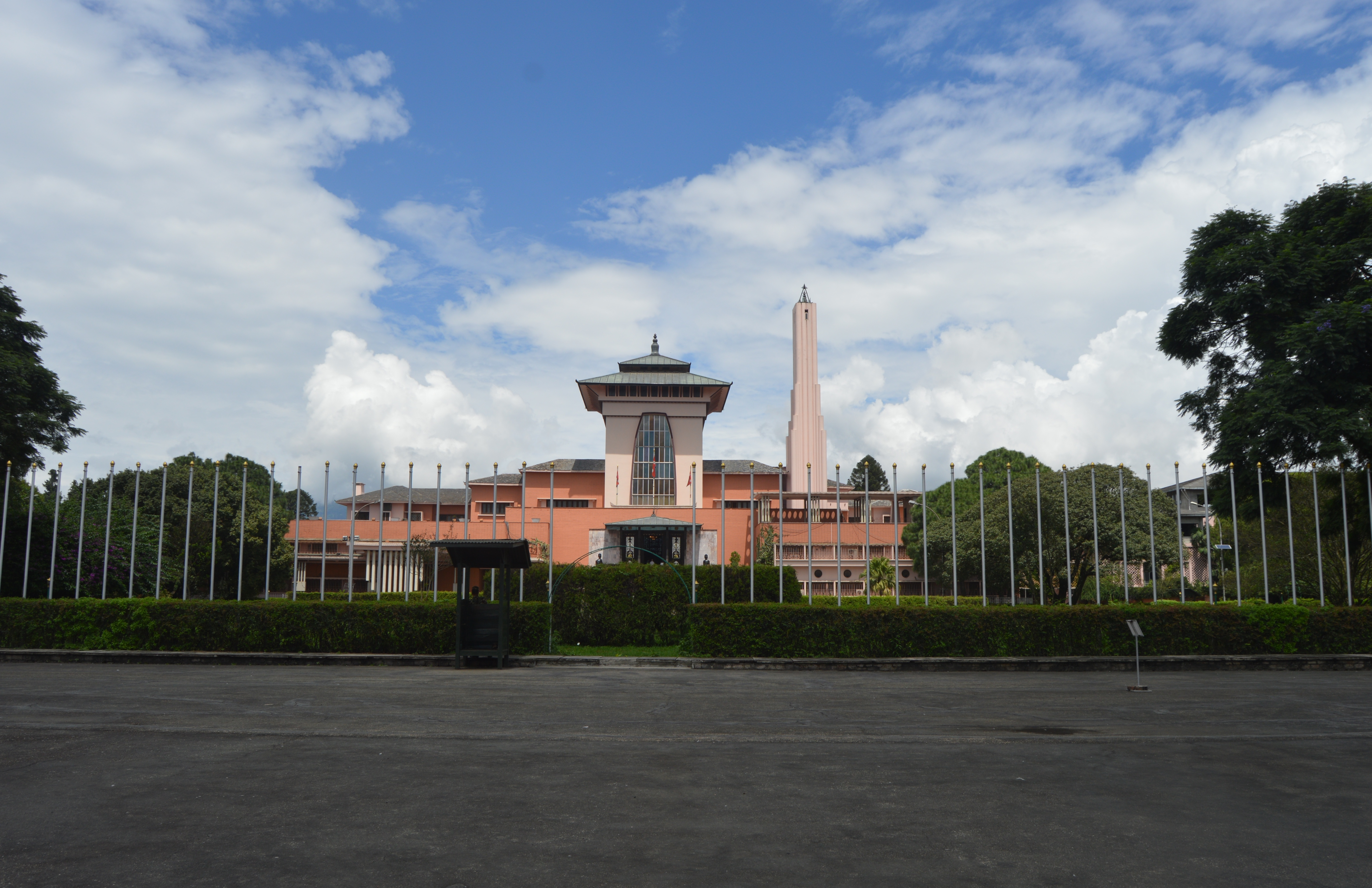
Narayanhiti Palace

- Bagh Durbar
- Bhaktapur Durbar
- Gorkha Durbar
- Hanuman Dhoka Palace
- Hetauda Durbar
- Kakani Durbar
- Lal Durbar
- Lumjung Durbar
- Nagarjun Durbar
- Narayanhity Royal Palace – scene of the 2001 Nepalese royal massacre
- Nuwakot Durbar
- Palpa Durbar
- Patan Durbar
- Rani Mahal
- Seto Durbar
- Sinduligadi Durbar
- Singha Durbar
- Tangaal Durbar
- Thapathali Durbar

== The Netherlands ==
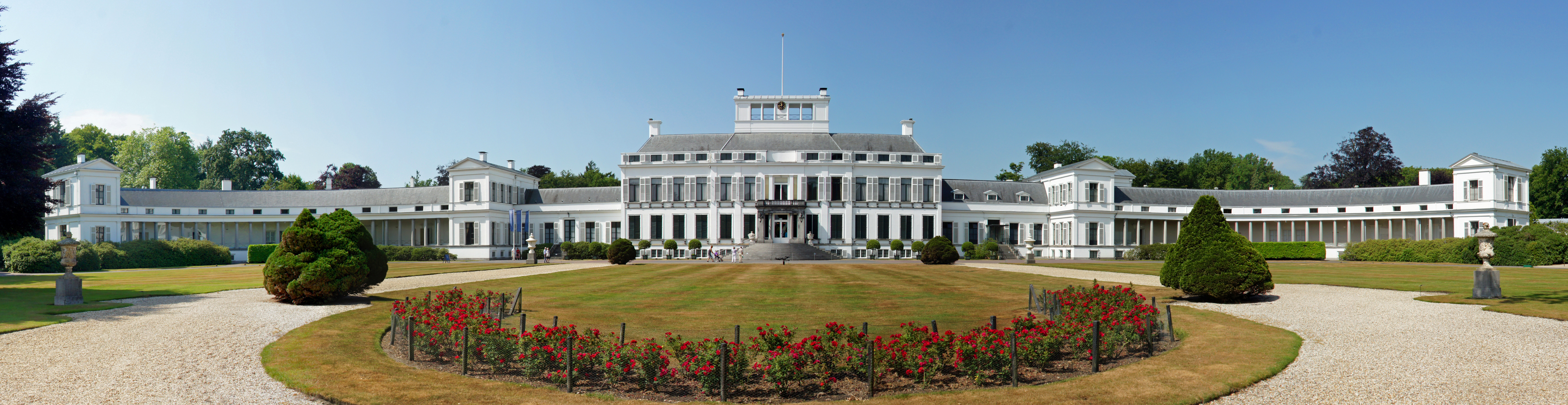
Soestdijk Palace

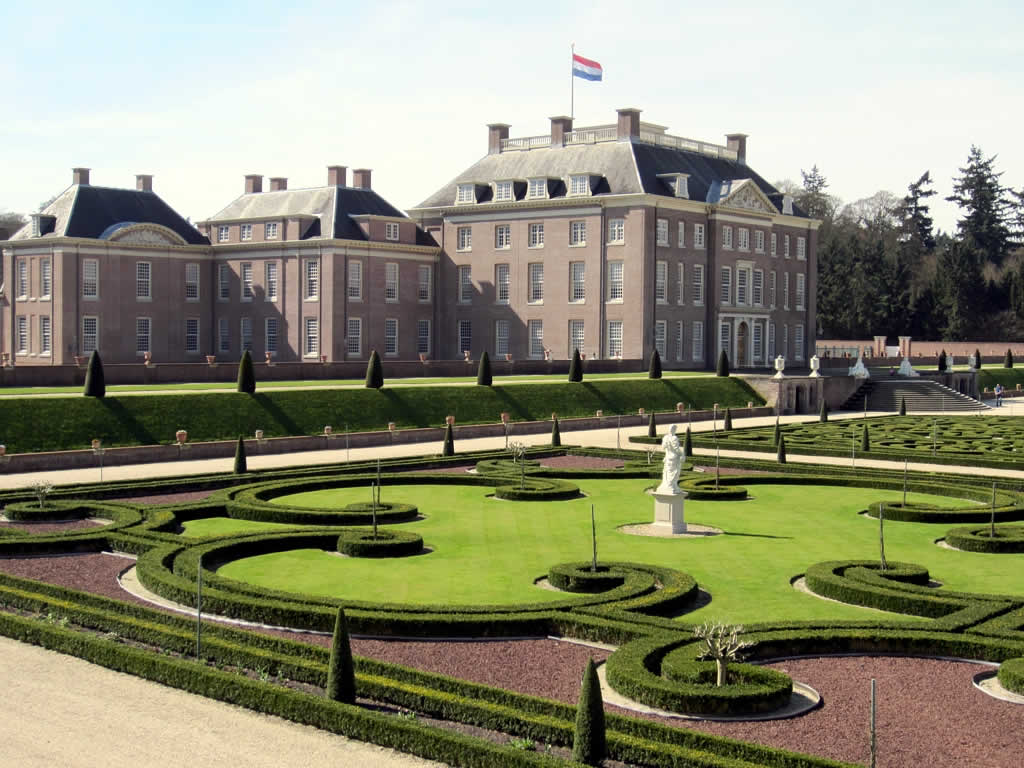
Het Loo Palace

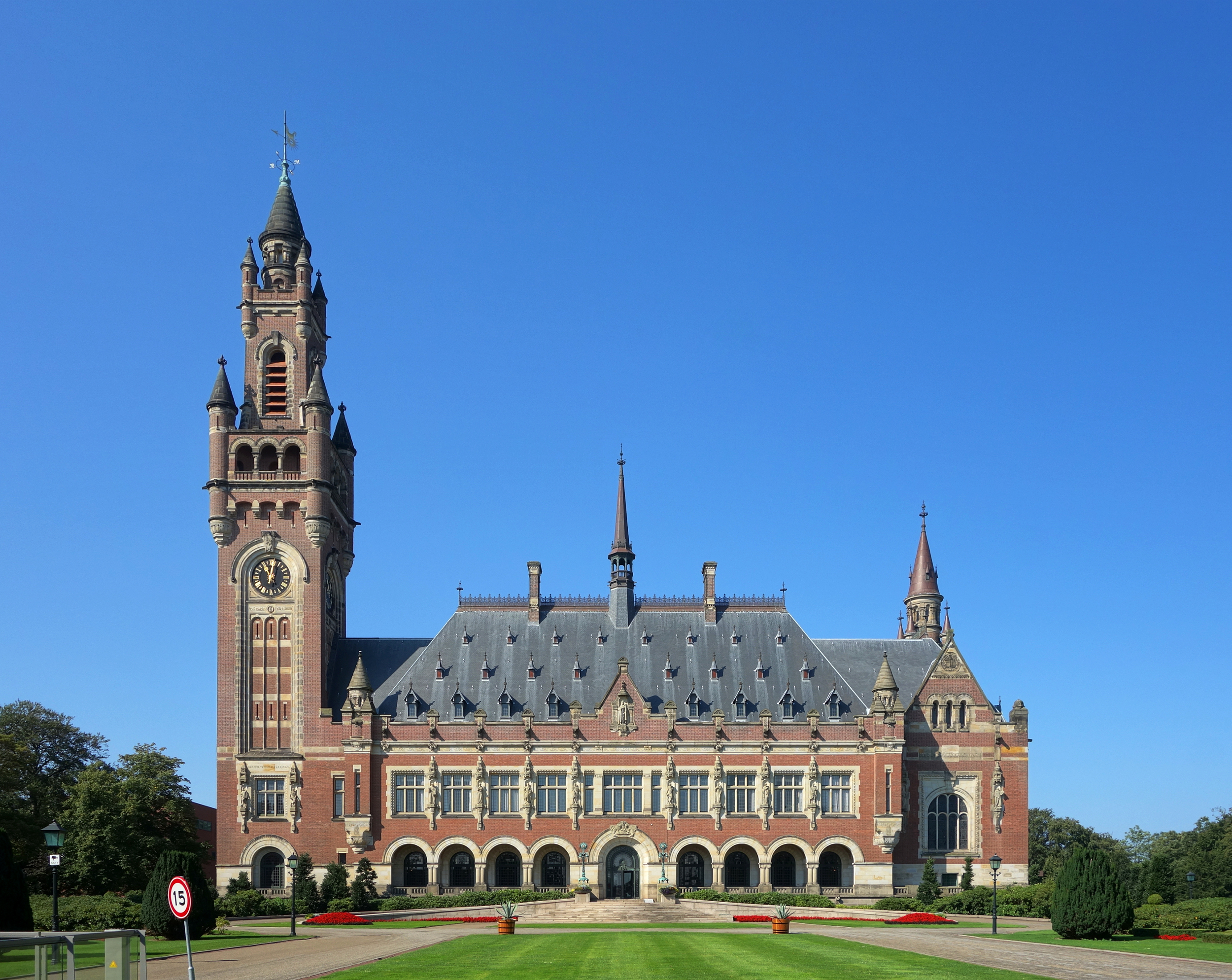
The Peace Palace

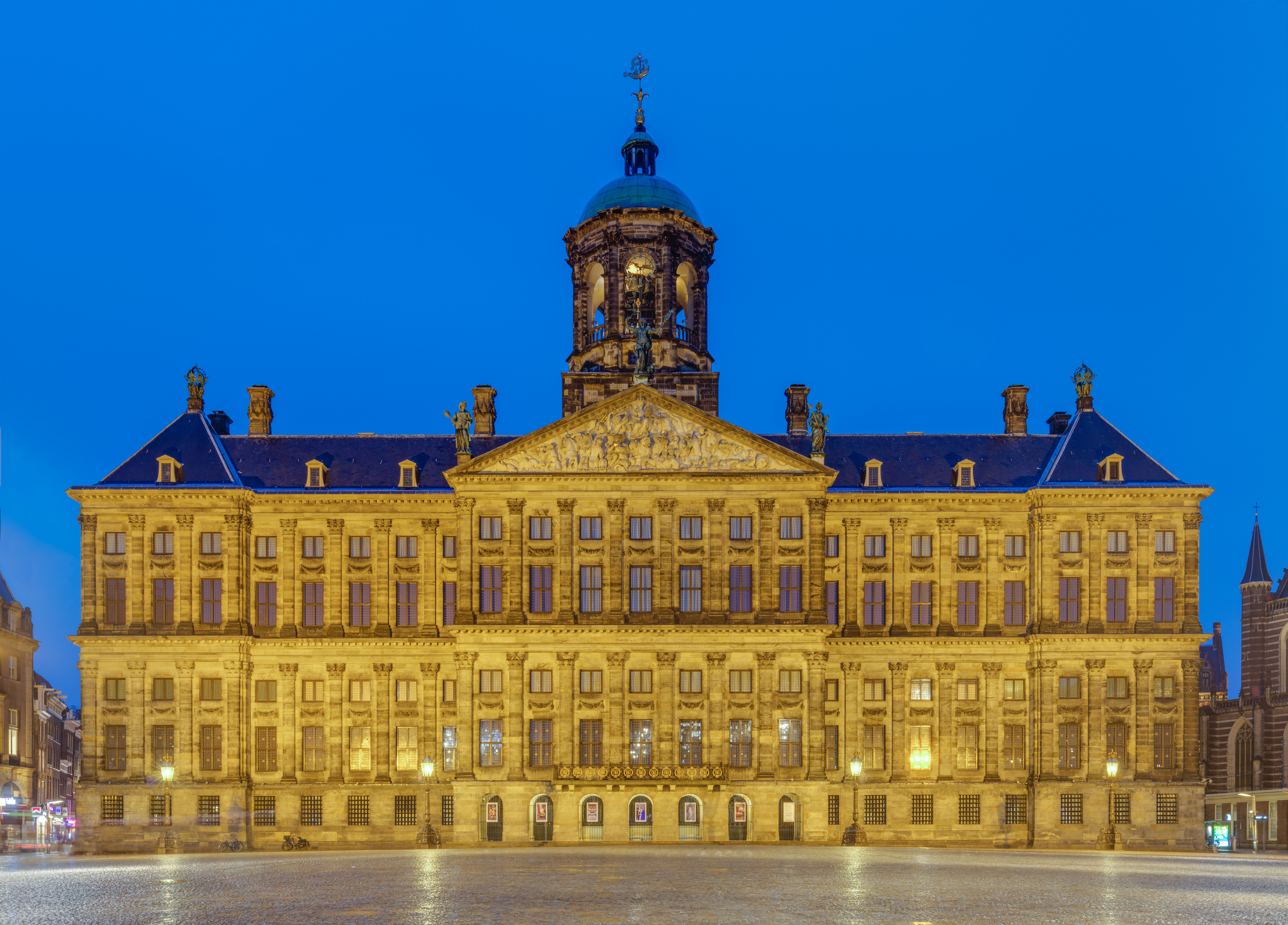
The Royal Palace of Amsterdam

- Anneville (Ulvenhout) – former royal residence, Ulvenhout
- Binnenhof – former royal residence, The Hague
- Bronbeek – former royal residence, Arnhem
- Breda Castle – former royal residence, Breda
- City Hall of Tilburg – former royal residence, Tilburg
- Drakensteyn Castle – Private royal residence, Baarn
- Het Loo (Paleis het Loo) – former royal residence, Apeldoorn
- Het Oude Loo – Private royal residence, Apeldoorn
- Huis Doorn – Former royal residence, doorn
- Huis ten Bosch Palace – royal residence, The Hague
- Koninklijke Schouwburg – former royal residence, The Hague
- Mauritshuis – former royal residence, The Hague
- Noordeinde Palace (Paleis Noordeinde) – royal residence, The Hague
- Royal Palace of Amsterdam (Koninklijk Paleis Amsterdam or Paleis op de Dam) – royal residence, Amsterdam
- Soestdijk Palace (Paleis Soestdijk) – former royal residence, Soestdijk
- Stadhouderlijk Hof – former royal residence, Leeuwarden
- Kneuterdijk Palace (Paleis Kneuterdijk) – former royal residence, The Hague
- Lange Voorhout Palace (Paleis Lange Voorhout) – former royal residence, The Hague
- Peace Palace (Vredespaleis) – Houses the international court of justice (judicial body of the United Nations), The Hague
- Duin en Kruidberg – former royal residence, Santpoort-Noord
- Villa Welgelegen – former royal residence, Haarlem

== New Zealand ==
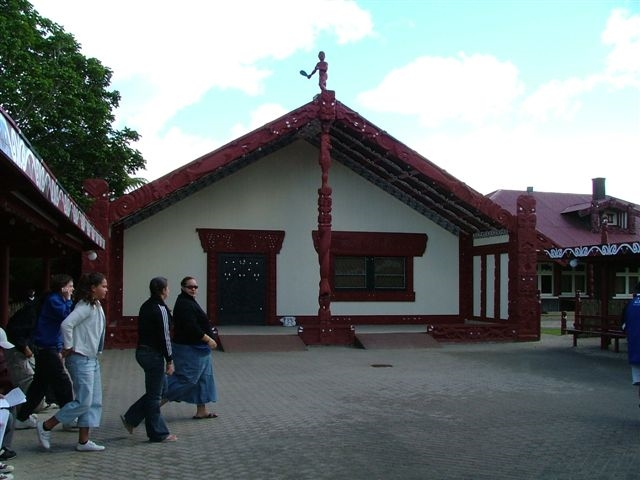
Mahinarangi meeting house

- Tūrangawaewae – official residence of the head of the Māori King Movement currently King Tūheitia Paki. The complex consists of Mahinarangi, Turongo and other substantial buildings used by the Kingitanga for a number of larger Iwi gatherings.

Apart from the large complex at Tūrangawaewae Marae located in the town of Ngāruawāhia, the previous Māori Monarch Te Atairangikaahu had a home at Waahi Marae in Huntly where she lived for most of her 40-year reign with her consort Whatumoana Paki. The Māori King or Queen are required to attend 33 Poukai annually conducted at Marae loyal to the Kingitangi movement. Many of these Marae maintain residences for the Māori King or Queen for them to use during such visits.

== Nigeria ==
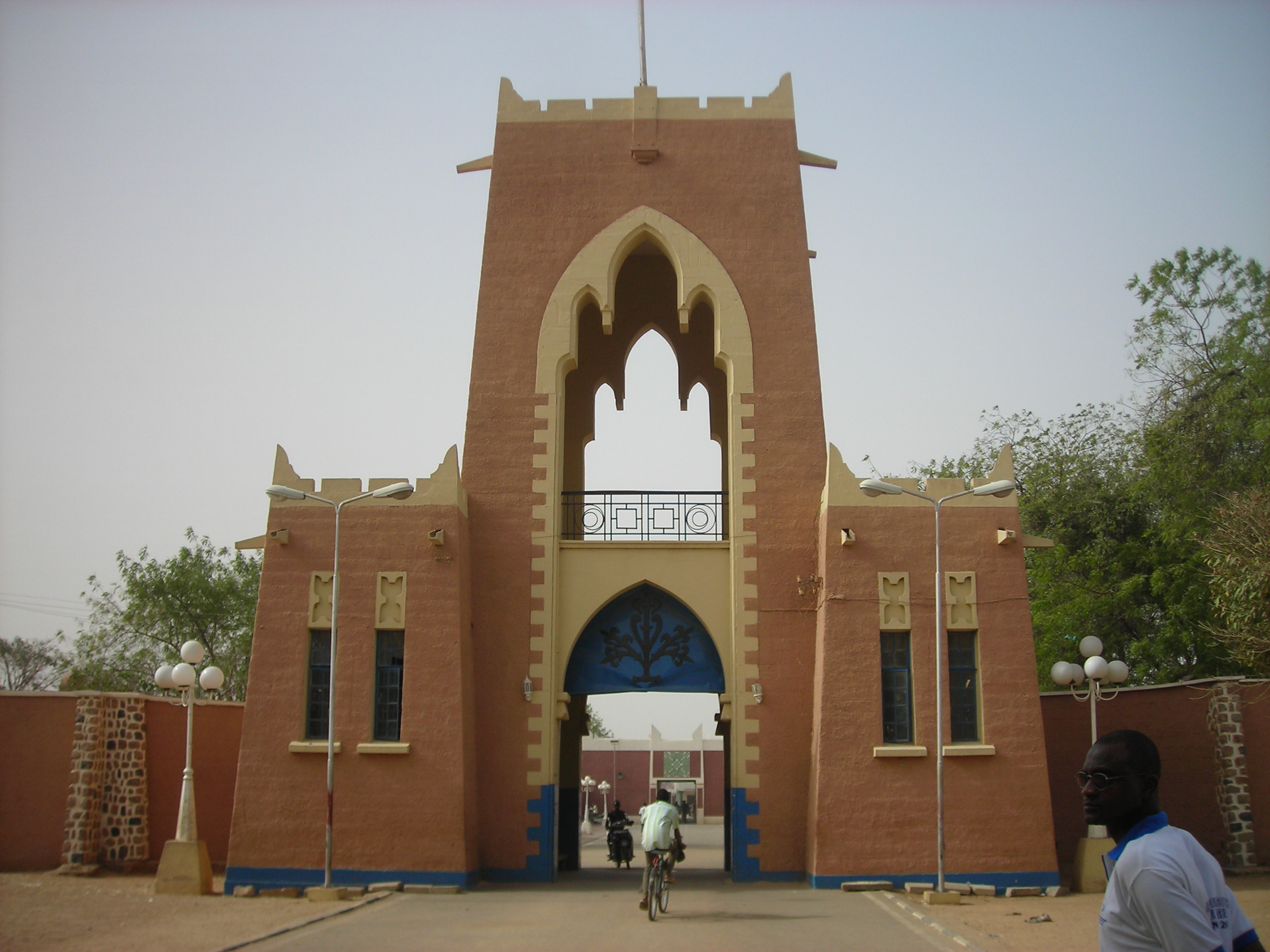
Gate to the Gidan Rumfa.

- The Emir's palace in Bauchi
- Gidan Rumfa in Kano
- Palace of Olowo of Owo in Owo Ondo State which contains more than one hundred courtyards, each with a unique traditional function.
- Royal Palace of the Oba of Benin in Benin City

== Norway ==
- Royal Palace, Oslo (Slottet) – royal residence
- Oscarshall – royal summer residence
- Ledaal – official residence of the King of Norway in Stavanger
- Stiftsgården

== Oman ==
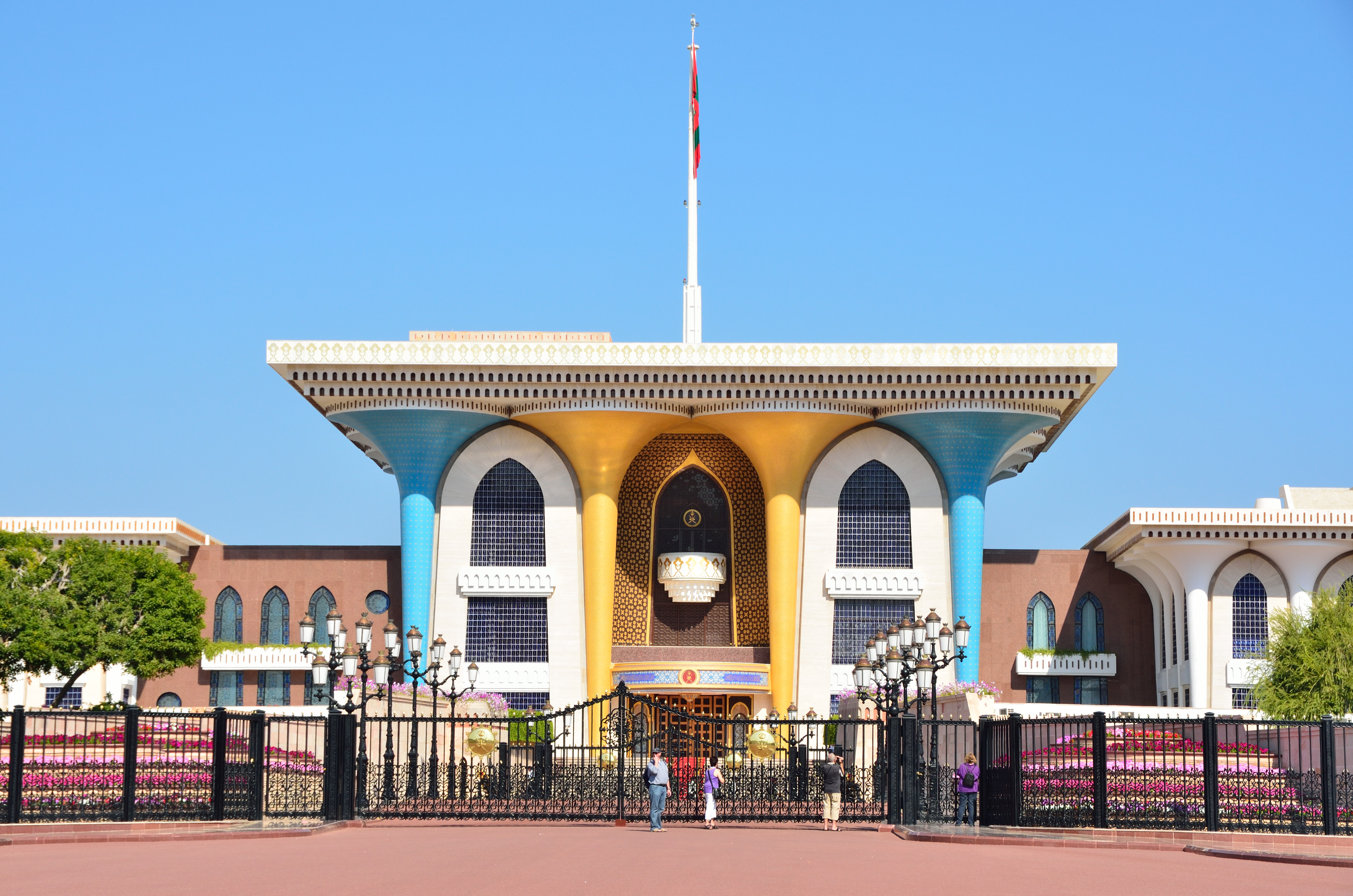
Al Alam Palace

- Al Alam Palace – Sultan's ceremonial palace in Old Muscat
- Al Baraka Palace – Sultan's residence in Seeb
- Al Hosn Palace – Sultan's residence on the waterfront in Salalah
- Al Maamoura Palace – Sultan's residence further inland in Salalah next to his Razat Farm
- Al Shomoukh Palace – Sultan's residence in Manah
- Bahjat Al Andaar Palace – Sultan's residence in Sohar

== Pakistan ==
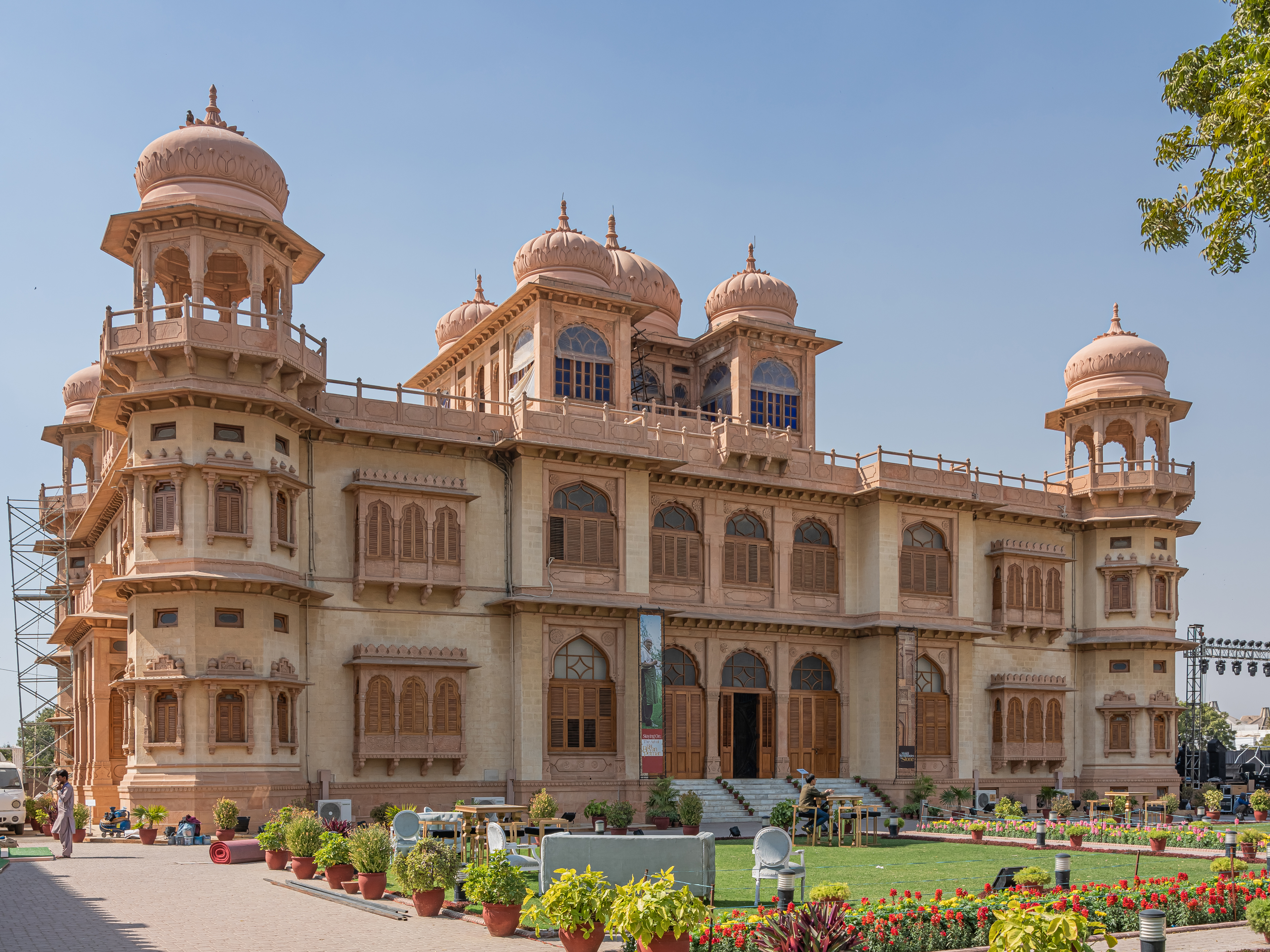
Mohatta Palace in Karachi, Pakistan.

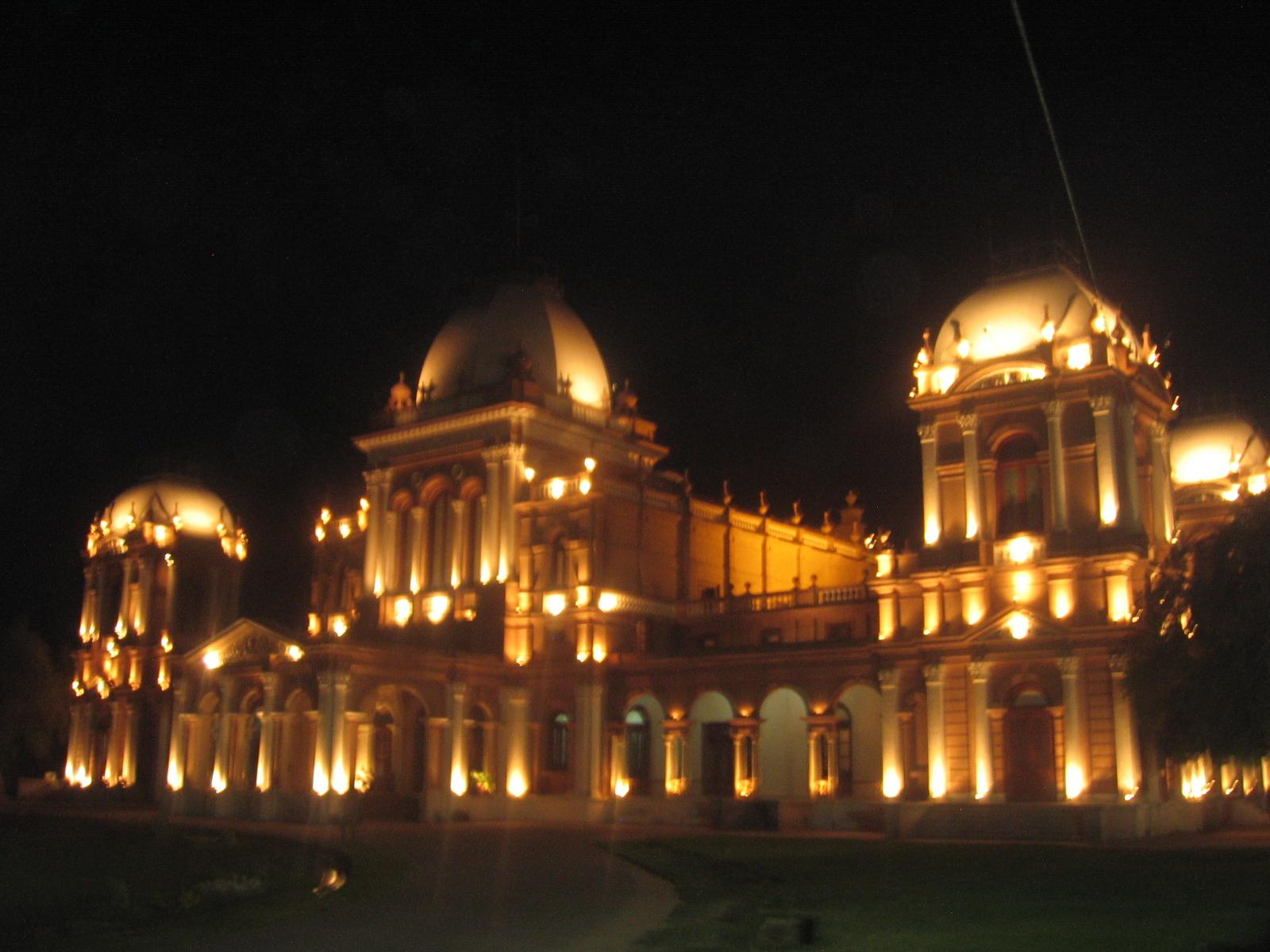
Noor Mahal in Bahawalpur, Pakistan.

- Aiwan-e-Sadr – Islamabad
- Mohatta Palace – Karachi
- Sadiq Garh Palace -Bahawalpur
- Gulzar Mahal – Bahawalpur
- Farukh Mahal – Bahawalpur
- Nishat Mahal – Bahawalpur
- Dubai Mahal – Bahawalpur
- Noor Mahal – Bahawalpur
- Omar Hayat Mahal – Jhang
- Raiwind Palace – Lahore
- Omar Hayat Mahal – Chiniot
- Sheesh Mahal (Lahore) – Lahore
- Derawar Fort – Bahawalpur
- Darbar Mahal – Bahawalpur
- Lal Haveli – Rawalpindi
- Ranikot – Sindh
- Bedi Mahal – Rawalpindi
- Shahi Qila – Lahore
- Faiz Mahal – Khairpur
- Bala Hissar – Peshwar

== Paraguay ==
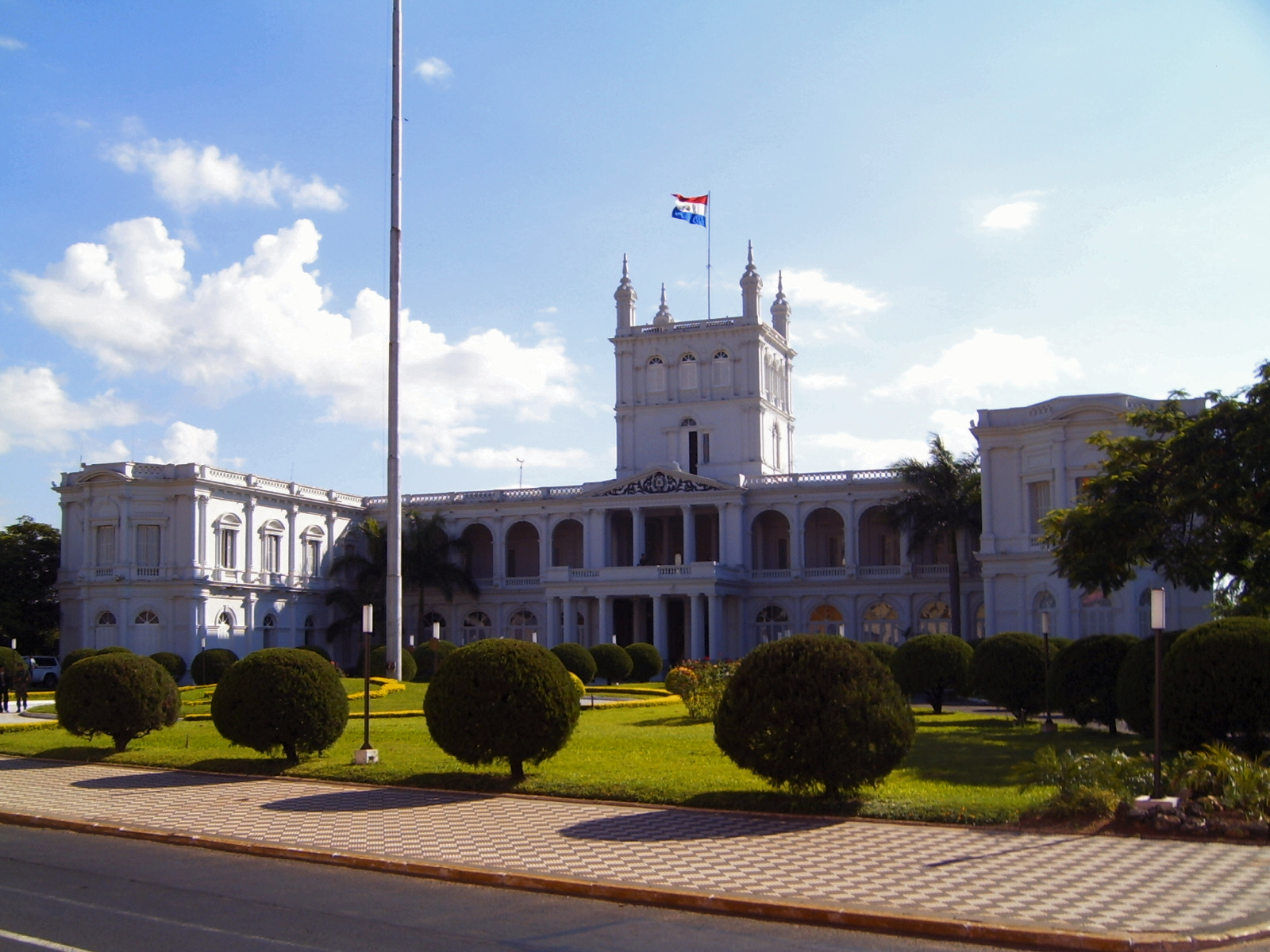
Lopez Presidential Palace in Asunción, Paraguay

- Mburuvichá Roga House, Paraguayan Presidential Residence – (Asunción)
- Palacio de los López, Paraguayan Seat of Government – (Asunción)

== Peru ==
- Archbishop Palace, Lima – Sear of the Roman Catholic Archdiocese of Lima
- Government Palace, Lima – Peruvian Seat of Government and home to the executive branch.
- Legislative Palace, Lima – seat of the Congress of Peru
- Machu Picchu, Cusco – An Inca Palace, now a major tourist destination.
- Osambela House, Lima – colonial palace in the Historic center of Lima
- Palace of Justice, Lima – seat of the Supreme Court of Peru
- Torre Tagle Palace, Lima – headquarters of the Ministry of Foreign Relations of Peru

== Philippines ==
The Mansion is the official summer palace of the President of the Philippines.

- Astana Putih – historical residence of the Sultan of Sulu in Umbul Duwa, Indanan, Sulu
- Archbishop's Palace (Villa San Miguel) – current residence of the Archbishop of Manila in Mandaluyong
- Archbishop's Palace – historical temporary residence of the Archbishop of Manila in San Fernando, Pampanga
- Ayuntamiento de Manila – former official residence and office of the Mayor of Manila, currently houses the Bureau of the Treasury
- Coconut Palace (Tahanang Pilipino) – currently owned by the GSIS in Pasay
- Darul Jambangan – historical residence of the Sultan of Sulu in Maimbung, Sulu
- Malacañang Palace – the official residence of the President of the Philippines, Manila
- Malacañang of the North – historical presidential residence in Paoay, Ilocos Norte
- Malacañang sa Sugbo – the presidential residence in Cebu City
- The Mansion – the presidential residence in Baguio
- Palacio Arzobispal – official residence of the Archbishop of Manila in Intramuros, Manila
- Palacio del Gobernador – historical residence of former Governors-General, currently a government building in Intramuros, Manila
- Torogan – historical residences of the Maranao sultans

== Poland ==
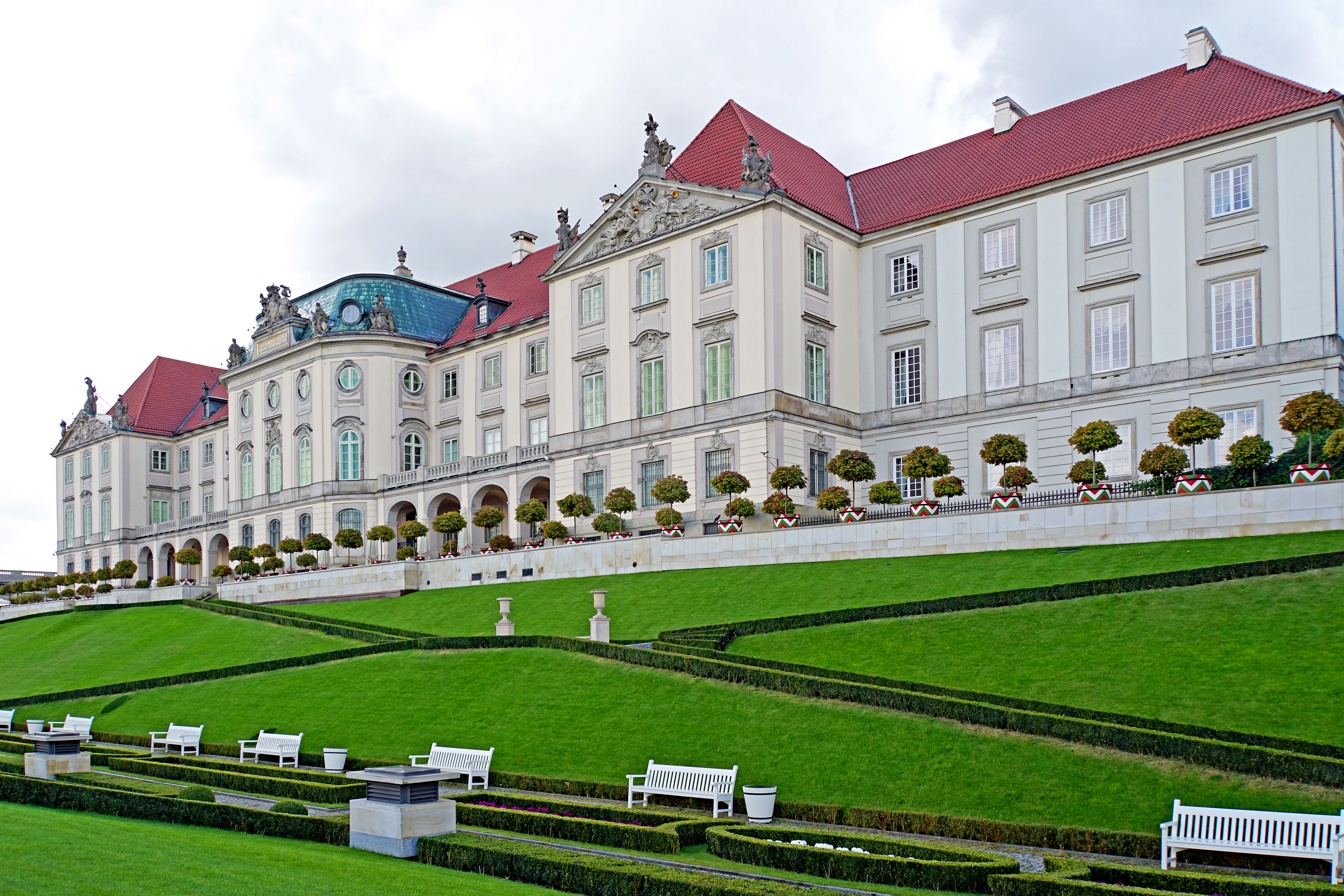
Royal Palace, Warsaw

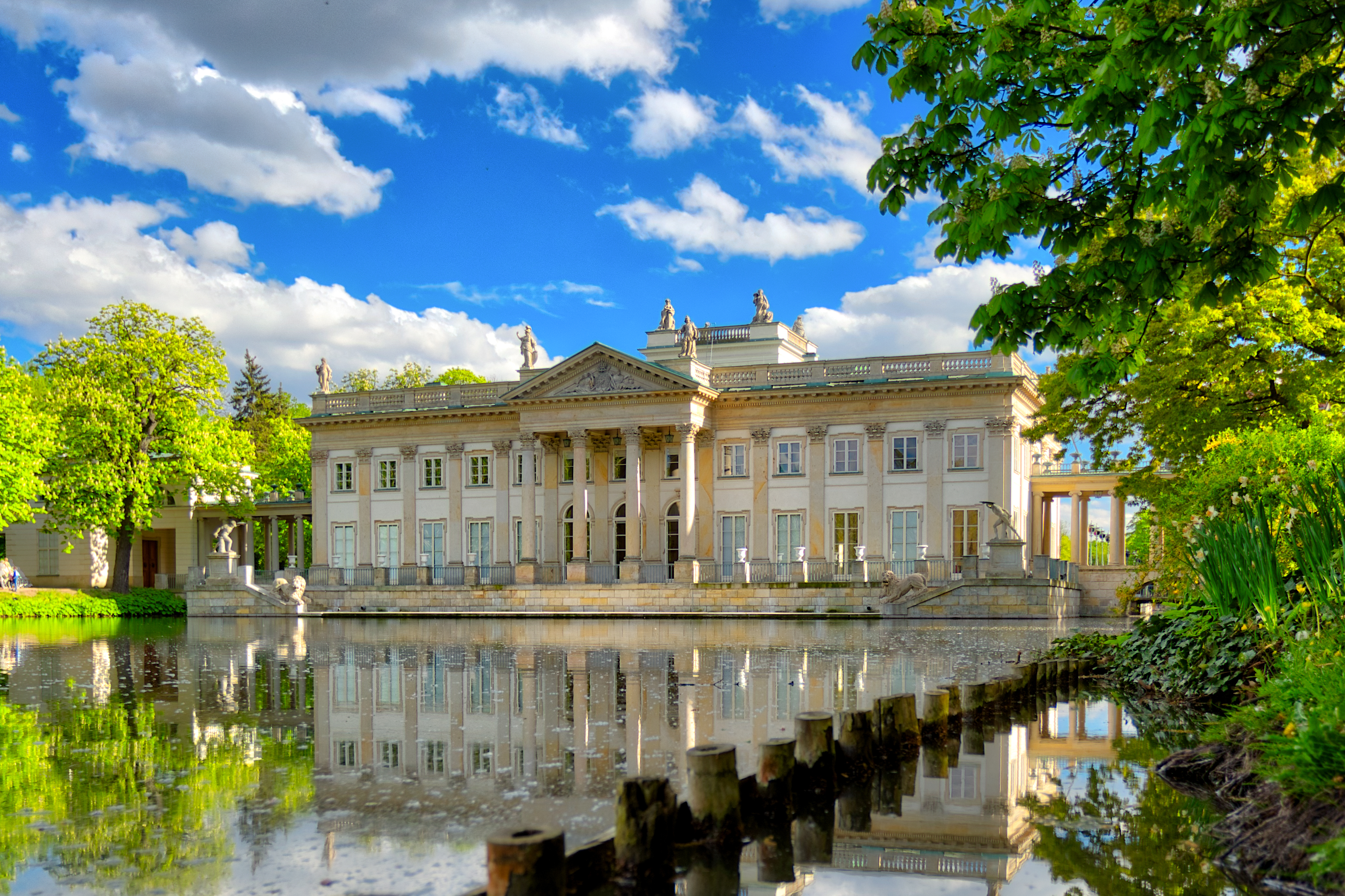
Palace on the Water in Warsaw

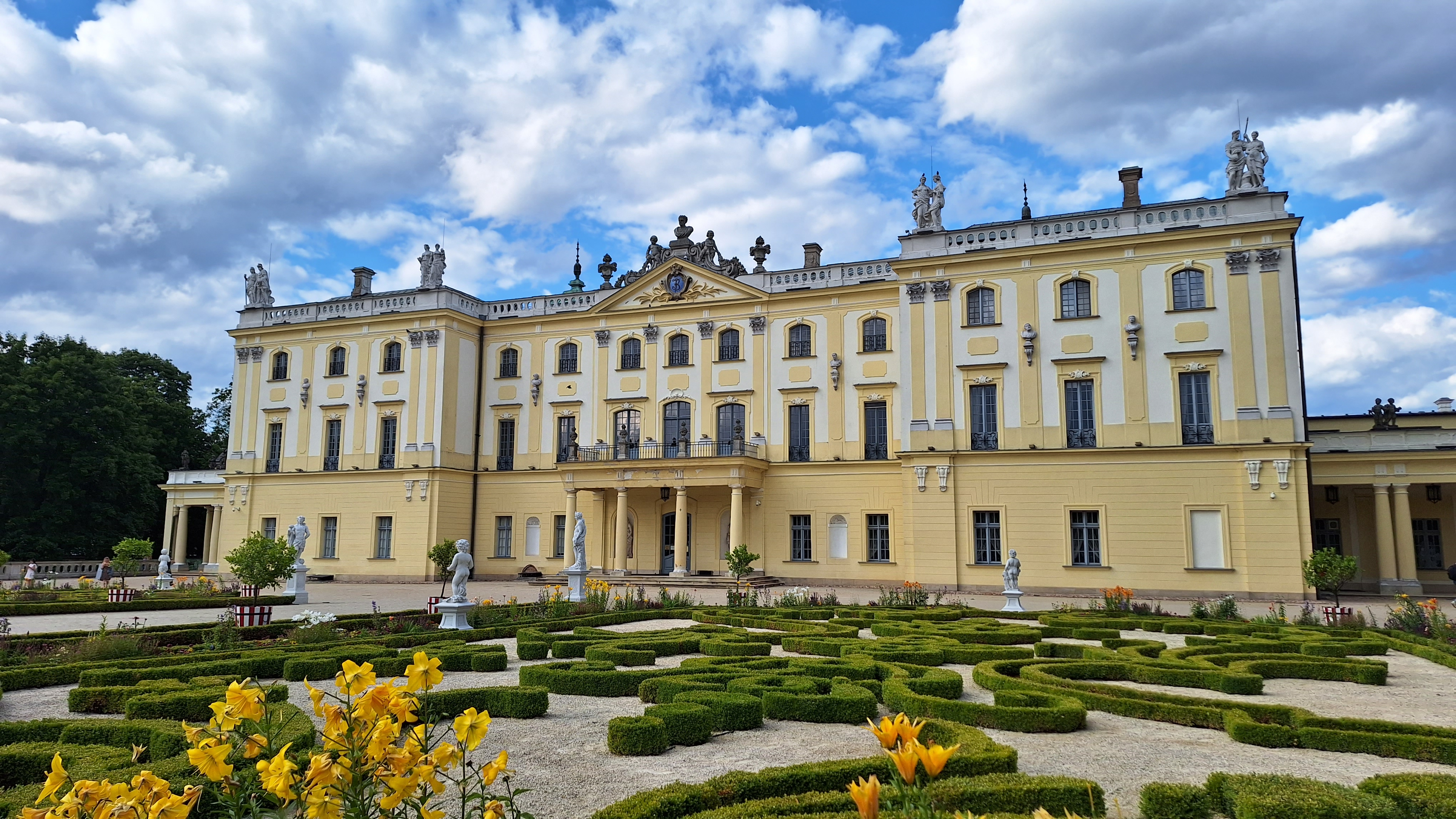
Branicki Palace in Białystok

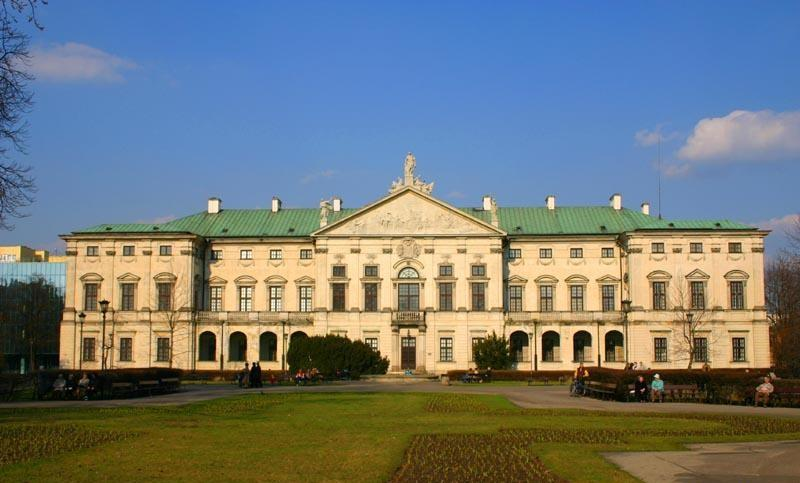
Krasiński Palace, Warsaw

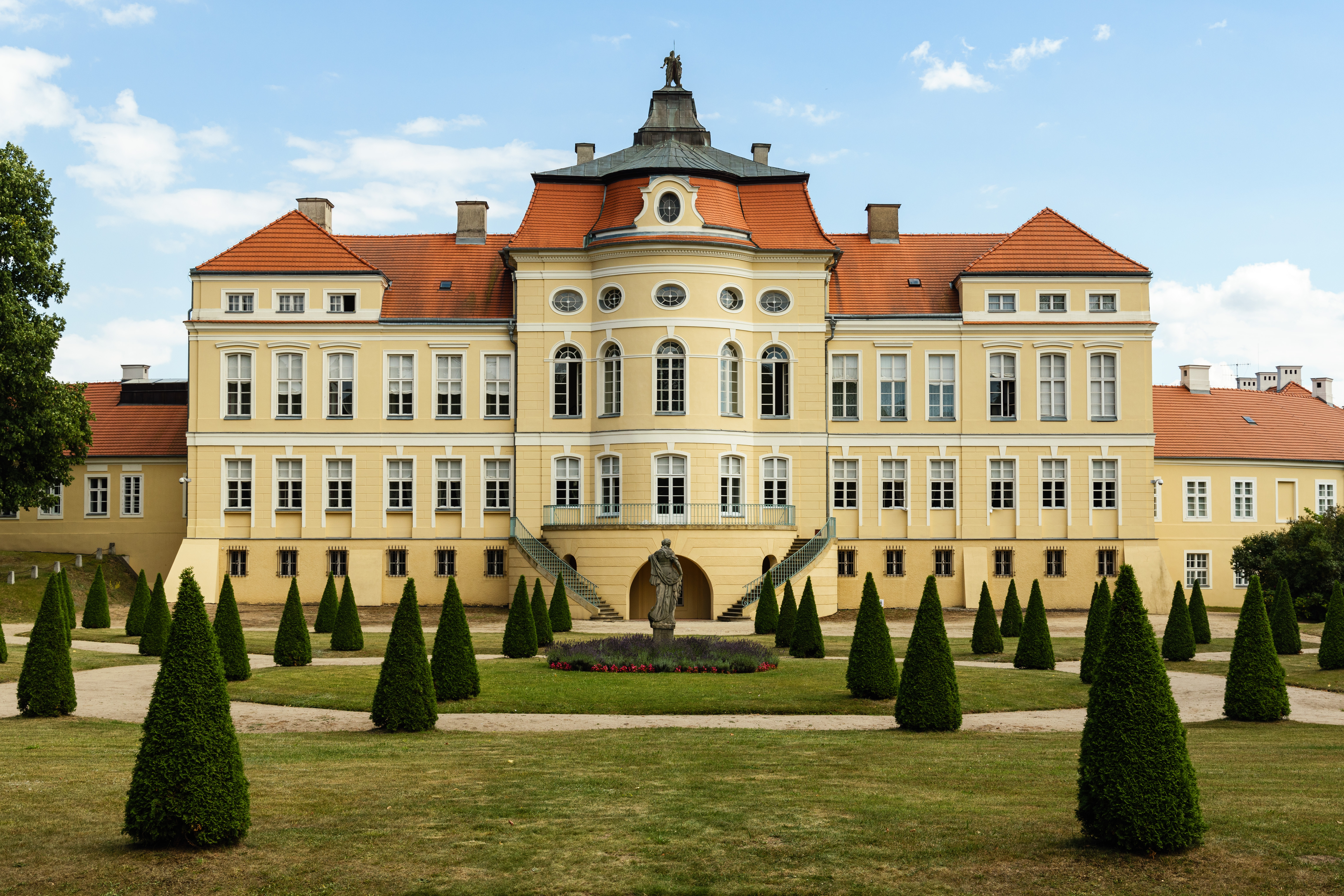
Rogalin Palace

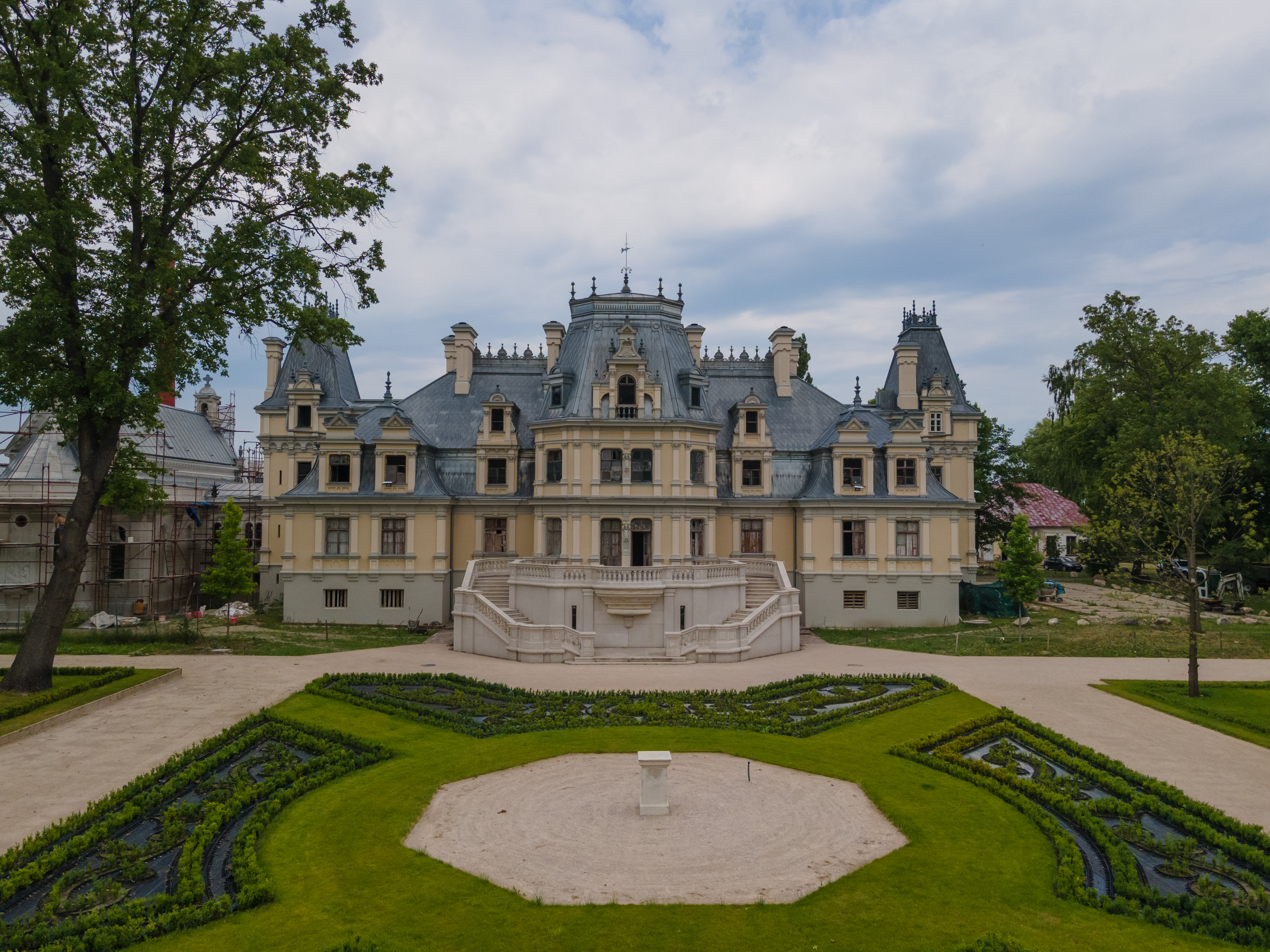
Sobański Palace

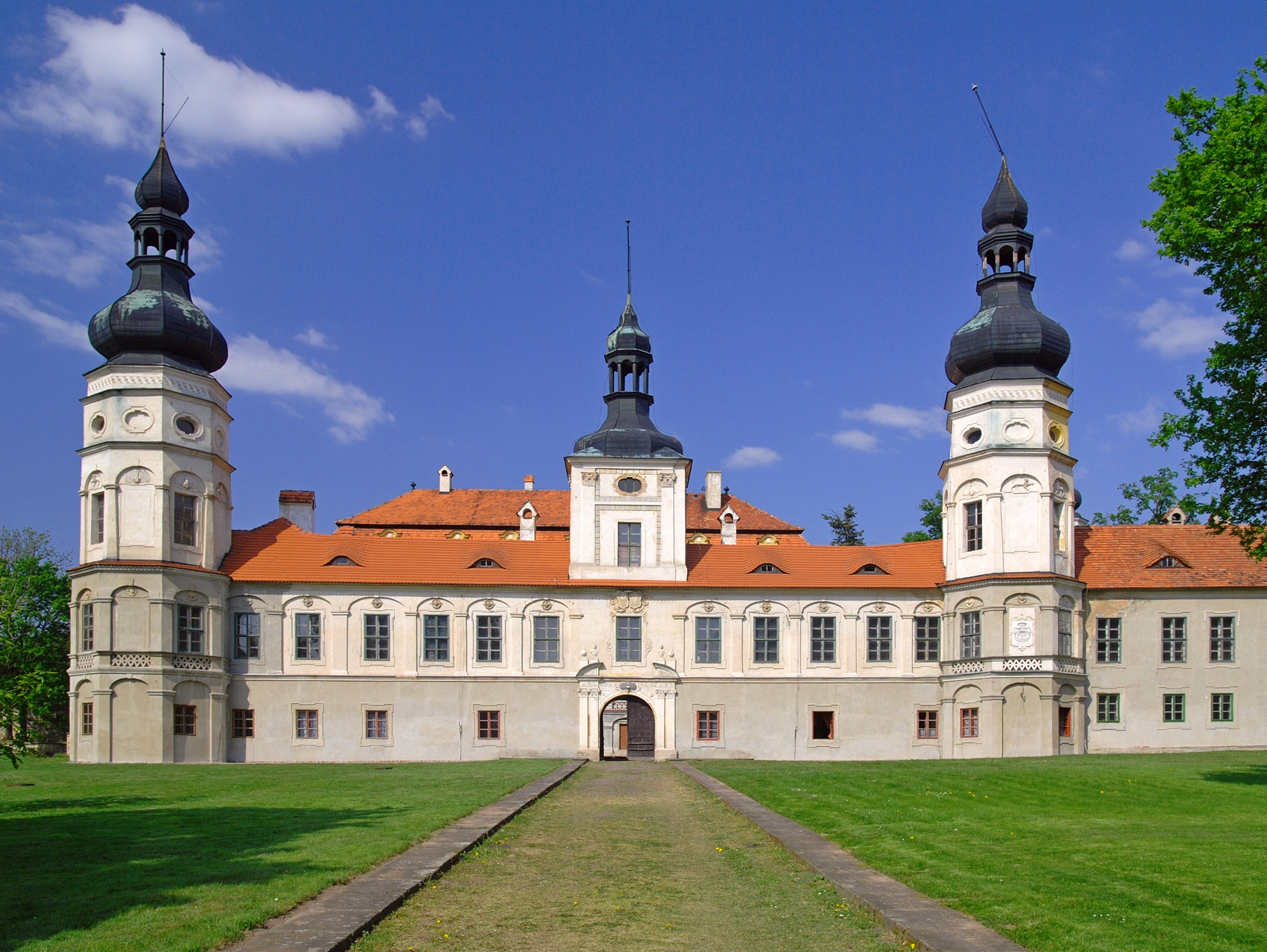
Żyrowa Palace

- Abbot's Palace, Gdańsk
- Bieliński Palace, Otwock Wielki
- Branicki Palace, Białystok
- Brynek Palace
- Czartoryski Palace, Puławy
- Dietel Palace, Sosnowiec
- Drogosze Palace
- Drzeczkowo Palace
- Działyński Palace, Poznań
- Gorzeński Palace, Śmiełów
- Izrael Poznański Palace, Łódź
- Jabłonna Palace
- Juliusz Heinzl Palace, Łódź
- Kamieniec Ząbkowicki Palace
- Karol Poznański Palace, Łódź
- Kobylniki Palace
- Kozłówka Palace
- Kurozwęki Palace
- Kielce Palace, Kielce
- Lubartów Palace
- Lubomirski Palace, Opole Lubelskie
- Lubostroń Palace
- Lancut Palace, Łańcut
- Łomnica Palace
- Mała Wieś Palace
- Mierzęcin Palace
- Nieborów Palace
- Oblęgorek Palace
- Ostromecko Palace
- Pławniowice Palace
- Przebendowski Palace
- Pszczyna Palace
- Radomicki Palace, Konarzewo, Poznań County
- Radziejowice Palace
- Radzyń Podlaski Palace
- Radziwiłł Palace, Antonin near Ostrzeszów
- Rogalin Palace
- Rydzyna Palace
- Sieniawa Palace
- Sobański Palace, Guzów
- Sulisław Palace
- Śmiłowice Palace
- Tęgoborze Palace
- Włodowice Palace
- Wielopolski Palace, Kraków
- Wola-Chojnata Palace
- Wrocław Palace
- Żyrowa Palace

=== Warsaw ===
- Belweder – former seat of the president, Warsaw
- Branicki Palace, Warsaw
- Brühl Palace, Warsaw
- Casimir Palace
- Czapski Palace, Warsaw
- Jabłonowski Palace
- Kazanowski Palace
- Krasiński's Palace, Warsaw
- Królikarnia, Warsaw
- Lubomirski Palace, Warsaw
- Marywil Palace
- Młodziejowski Palace
- Myślewicki Palace, Warsaw
- Natolin Palace, Warsaw
- Ostrogski Palace, Warsaw
- Presidential Palace, Warsaw – seat of the president
- Palace of the Four Winds, Warsaw
- Potocki Palace, Warsaw
- Royal Castle, Warsaw – former royal palace
- Sapieha Palace, Warsaw
- Sobański Palace, Warsaw
- Staszic Palace, Warsaw
- Palace on the Isle, Warsaw
- Saxon Palace, Warsaw
- Tin-roofed Palace, Warsaw
- Tyszkiewicz Palace, Warsaw
- Ujazdowski Castle
- Wilanów Palace – former summer palace of the King of Poland

== Qatar ==
- Al Rayyan Palace
- Al Wukair Palace
- Markhiya Palace
- Barzan Palace
- Amiri Diwan Palace
- Umm Salal Palace
- Al Wajbah Palace
- Al Gharrafa Palace
- Al Jassasiya Palace
- Al Mirgab Palace
- Al Waab Palace

== Romania ==
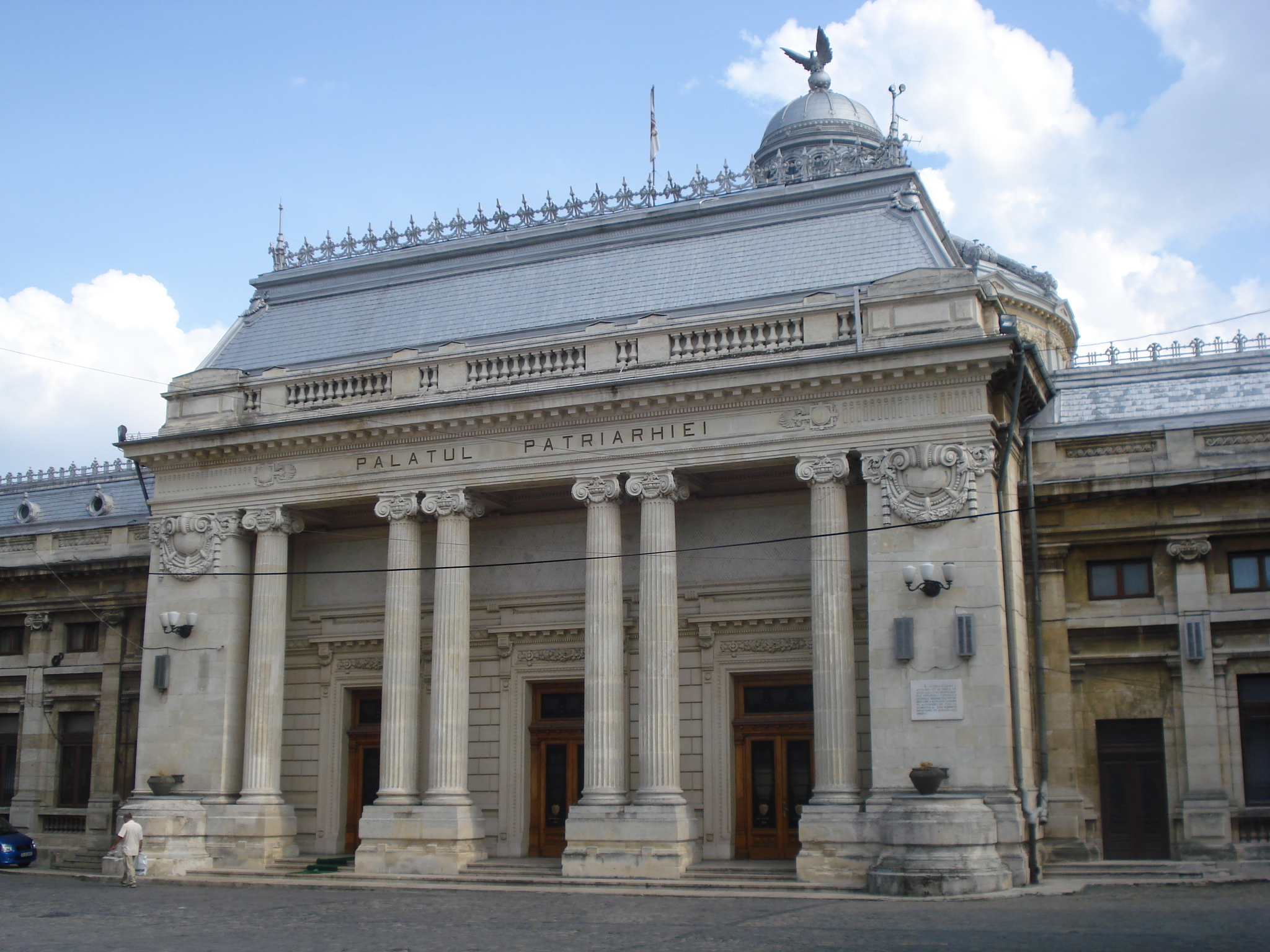
Patriarchal Palace, Bucharest

- Apollo Palace – Târgu Mureş
- Banffy Palace – Cluj-Napoca, built 1791.
- Baroque Palace of Oradea – founded in 1762 as the district Bishopric Palace.
- Baroque Palace, Timișoara
- Berde Palace, Cluj-Napoca
- Black eagle palace – Oradea
- Brukenthal National Museum – An 18th-century urban palazzo of Baron Brukenthal in Sibiu.
- Dauerbach Palace – Timișoara
- Dejan Palace, Timișoara
- Dicasterial Palace, Timișoara
- Dinu Mihail Palace – Craiova, today a museum.
- Finance Palace – Cluj-Napoca
- Ghica family Palace – Built in 1880, late Baroque, located in Bacău district.
- Löffler Palace, Timișoara
- Mogoșoaia Palace – Near Bucharest, founded 1698, built in Romanian Renaissance style.
- Orthodox Archiepiscopal Palace – Cluj-Napoca
- Palace of Culture (Iaşi) – rebuilt over Princely Court of Moldavia, during Carol I.
- Palace of Justice, Cluj-Napoca
- Patriarchal Palace – founded 1653, home for Romanian Orthodox heads of church. Also known as Palace of the Chamber of Deputies.
- Peleș Castle – former Sinaia summer residence of Romanian royal family.
- Pelișor Castle – On the grounds of Peleș Castle.
- Postal Palace, Cluj-Napoca
- Prefecture Palace, Cluj-Napoca
- Reduta Palace, Cluj-Napoca
- Regional Railways Palace, Cluj-Napoca
- Roznoveanu Palace – Since the 1770s, baroque palace in Iași.
- Ruginoasa Palace – neogothic palace built in 1811, home of Sturdza family and Prince Cuza.
- Sturdza Palace, Miclăușeni, Iași County
- Szechenyi Palace, Timișoara
- Széki Palace, Cluj-Napoca
- Urania Palace, Cluj-Napoca

=== Bucharest ===
- Cantacuzino Palace – Today George Enescu Museum, Bucharest.
- CEC Palace, Bucharest – palace of National Savings Bank, baroque, 1896.
- Cotroceni Palace – seat of the president, former Royal Palace, Bucharest, built for King Carol I of Romania in 1888, on a 1679 foundation.
- Creţulescu Palace – Bucharest
- Palace of Justice – founded 1890, neo-Renaissance, Bucharest.
- Palace of the Parliament, Bucharest – Absolute largest palace of the world.
- Romanian National Museum of History – founded 1894, in Bucharest, former Postal Palace, neoclassic.
- Sutu Palace – founded 1833 by Costache Sutu, today Museum of Bucharest.
- The Royal Palace – now National Museum of Art of Romania, Bucharest
- Victoria Palace – founded 1937, today seat of the Government of Romania

== Russia ==
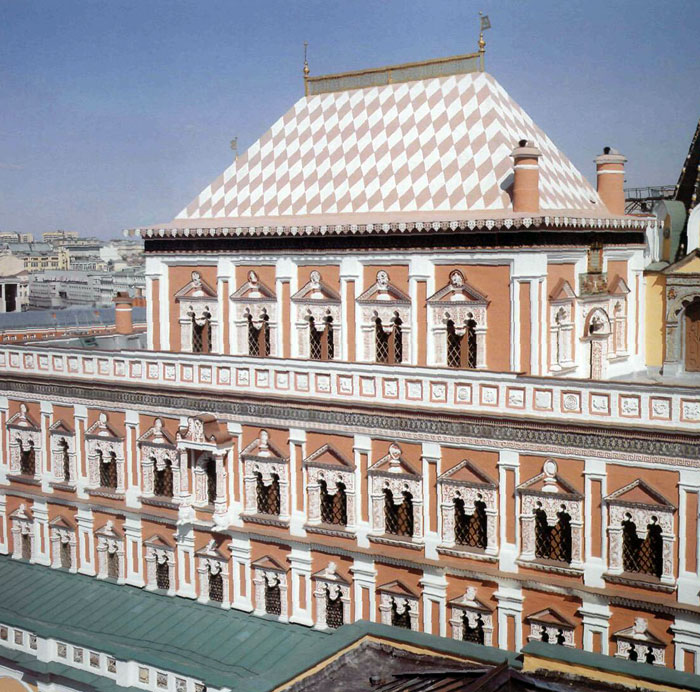
Terem Palace

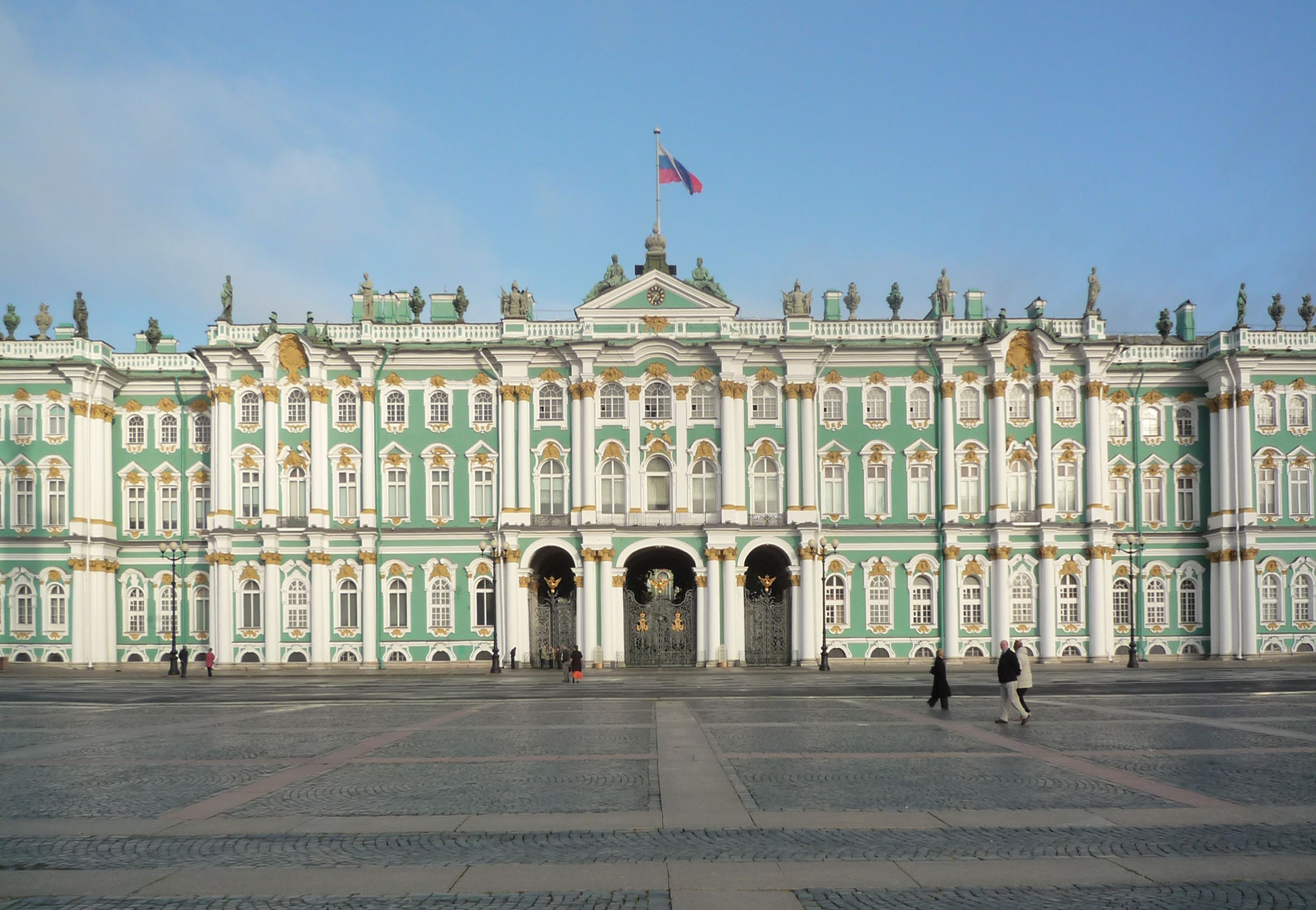
Winter Palace

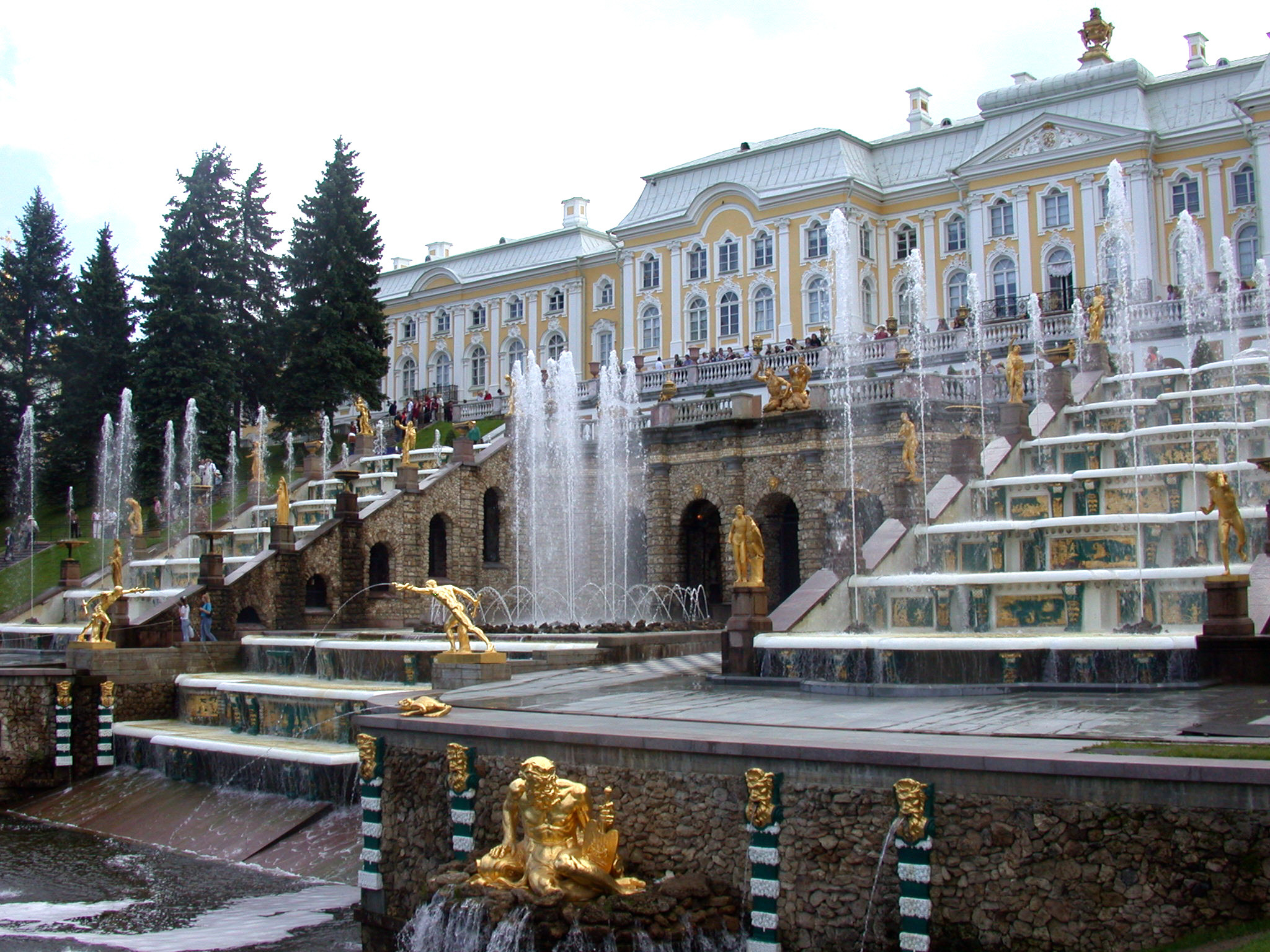
Peterhof Palace

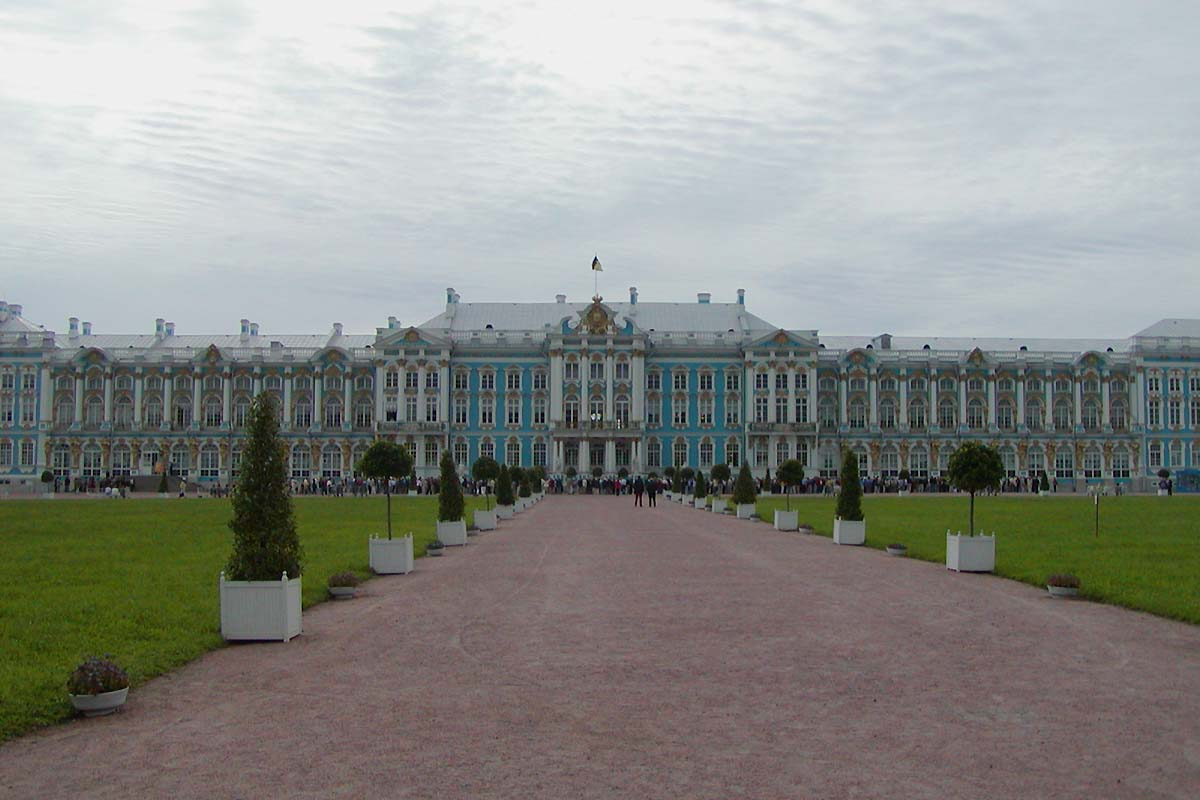
Catherine Palace

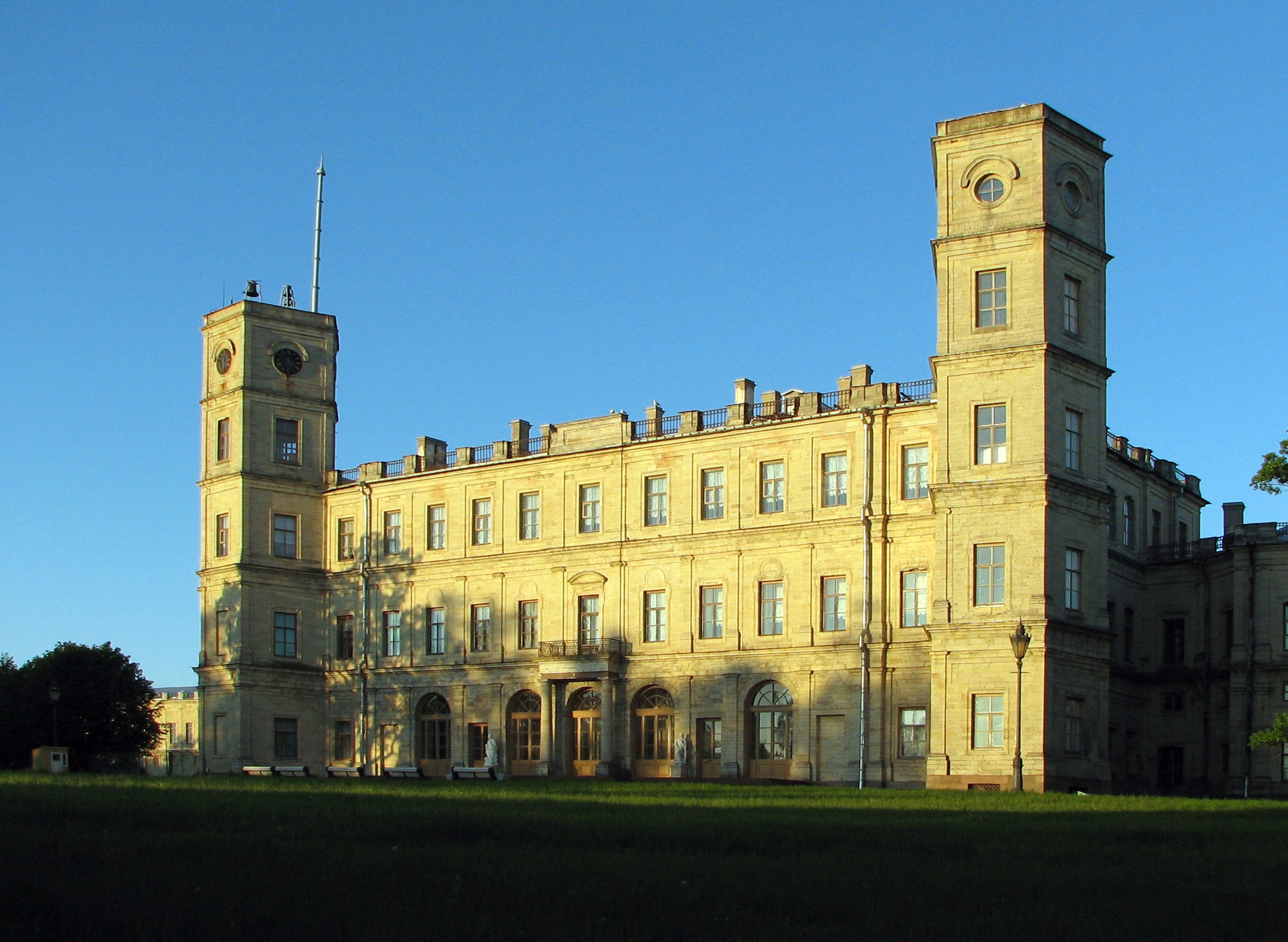
Gatchina Palace

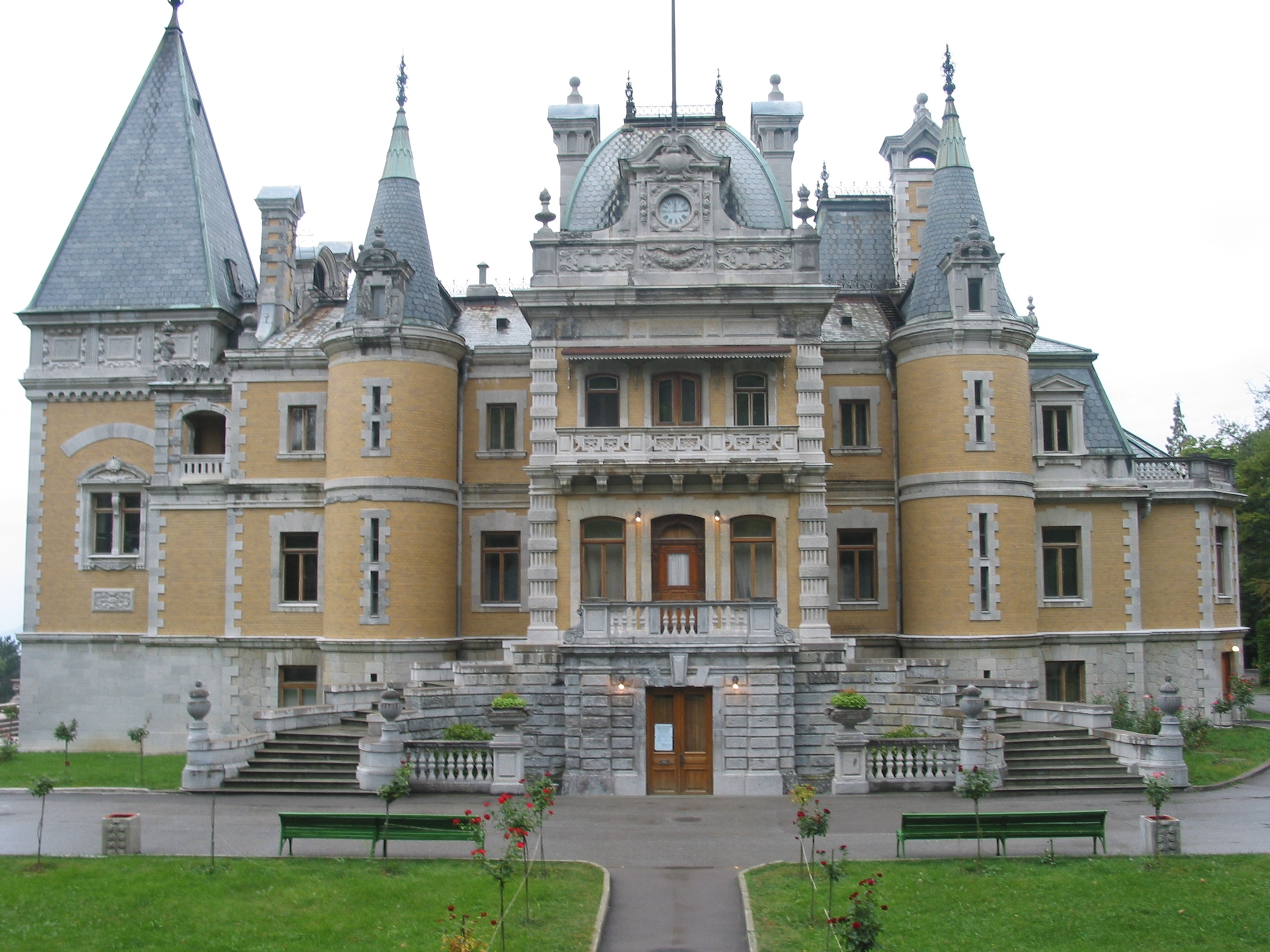
Massandra Palace

=== Gatchina ===
- Gatchina Palace
- Priory Palace

=== Kaliningrad ===
- Königsberg Castle (Demolished)

=== Moscow ===
- Catherine Palace
- Grand Kremlin Palace
- Kolomenskoye palace
- Kuskovo Palace
- Meyendorff Castle
- Ostankino Palace
- Palace of Facets
- Terem Palace
- Tsaritsyno Palace

=== Oranienbaum ===
- Oranienbaum Palace
- Palace of Ropsha

=== Pavlovsk ===
- Pavlovsk Palace
- Bip Castle

=== Pella ===
- Pella Palace

=== Peterhof ===
- Peterhof Palace

=== Pushkin ===
- Alexander Palace
- Catherine Palace

=== Ramon ===
- Ramon Palace

=== Saint Petersburg ===
- Alexis Palace
- Anichkov Palace
- Beloselsky-Belozersky Palace
- Constantine Palace
- Kamenny Island Palace
- Marble Palace
- Mariinsky Palace
- Menshikov Palace
- Mikhailovsky Palace
- St Michael's Castle
- New Michael Palace
- Naryshkin-Shuvalov Palace
- Nicholas Palace
- Shuvalov Palace
- Stone Island Palace
- Stroganov Palace
- Old Summer Palace
- New Summer Palace
- Tauride Palace
- Vladimir Palace
- Vorontsov Palace
- Winter Palace
- Yelagin Palace
- Yusupov Palace

=== Strelna ===
- Constantine Palace

=== Taganrog ===
- Alferaki Palace

=== Tver ===
- Catherine Palace

== Rwanda ==
- Ibwami – former royal court, Nyabisindu

== Saudi Arabia ==
- Palace of Yamamah, Riyadh
- Rawdat Khuraim, Riyadh
- Ferme Janadriyah, Riyadh
- Royal State Palace, Jeddah
- Safa Palace, Mecca

== Serbia ==
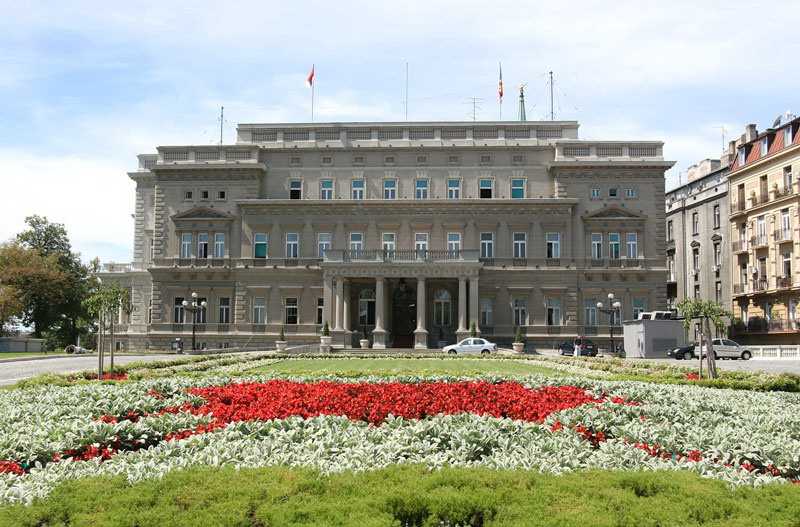
Royal Palace of the Obrenović dynasty of Serbia, presently housing the City Assembly of Belgrade

- Royal Compound
  - White Court – part of the Royal Compound of the Karađorđević dynasty, Dedinje, Belgrade
  - Royal Palace – part of the Royal Compound of the Karađorđević dynasty, Dedinje, Belgrade
- Old Palace – royal Palace of the Obrenović dynasty; today the residence of the City Assembly of Belgrade, Stari grad, Belgrade
- New Palace – royal Palace of the Karađorđević dynasty; today it is the seat of the President of Serbia, Stari grad, Belgrade
- Prince Miloš's Residence — royal Palace of Prince Miloš Obrenović, Topčider, Belgrade
- Princess Ljubica's Residence — royal Palace of Prince Miloš Obrenović and Princess Ljubica Vukomanović, Stari grad, Belgrade
- Obrenović Villa — royal summer house of the Obrenović dynasty, Smederevo
- Despot Stefan Tower – medieval Serbian Palace of Stefan Lazarević, Belgrade Fortress, Stari grad, Belgrade
- Palace of Serbia — governmental building; previously known as the Palace of the Federation during SFR Yugoslavia times, New Belgrade, Belgrade
- Captain Miša's Mansion — intended as a court for the grandson of Đorđe Petrović, today it is the seat of the University of Belgrade, Stari grad, Belgrade

== Singapore ==
- The Istana – Formerly the Government House of Singapore, Currently a seat of the president of Singapore.
- Istana Lama – A demolished house which was once belonged to the Temenggong of Johor Abdul Rahman.
- Istana Kampong Glam – A historical house which was once belonged to the Sultan of Johor Ali Iskandar Shah. Now a Malay Heritage Museum.
- Istana Bidadari – A demolished house which was once belonged to the Maharaja of Johor Abu Bakar's wife Zubaidah binti Abdullah.
- Istana Tyersall – A demolished house which was once belonged to the Sultan of Johor Abu Bakar.
- Istana Woodneuk – An abandoned house which was once belonged to the Sultan of Johor Ibrahim Al-Marhum.

== Slovakia ==
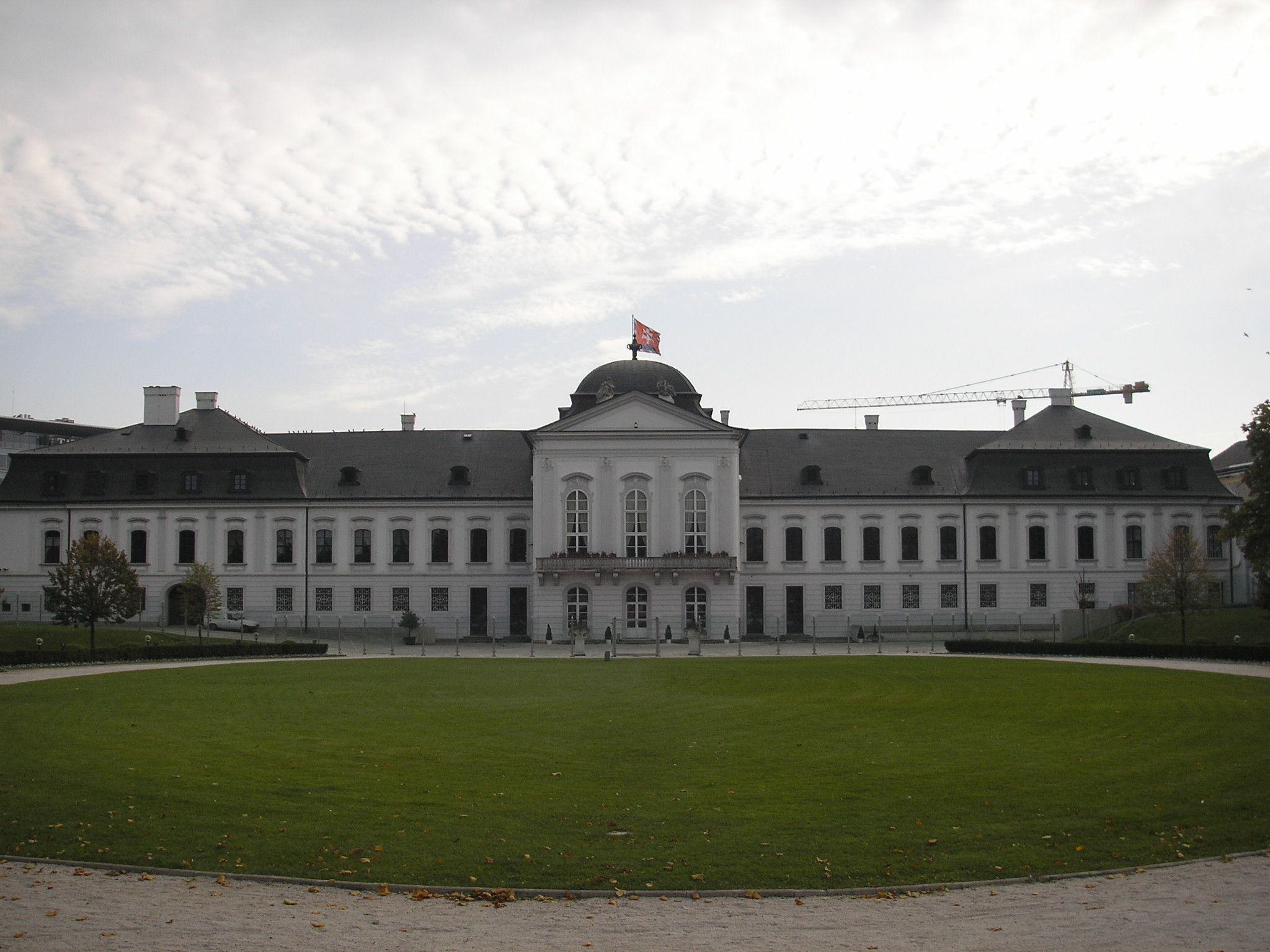
Grassalkovich Palace, Bratislava

- Esterházy Palace, Bratislava – home to the Slovak National Gallery
- Grassalkovich Palace, Bratislava – seat of the president
- Johann Pálffy Palace, Bratislava – home to the Bratislava City Gallery
- Mirbach Palace, Bratislava – home to the Bratislava City Gallery
- Pálffy Palace, Bratislava
- Primate's Palace, Bratislava – seat of the city government and place of the Treaty of Pressburg in 1805
- Summer Archbishop's Palace, Bratislava

== South Africa ==
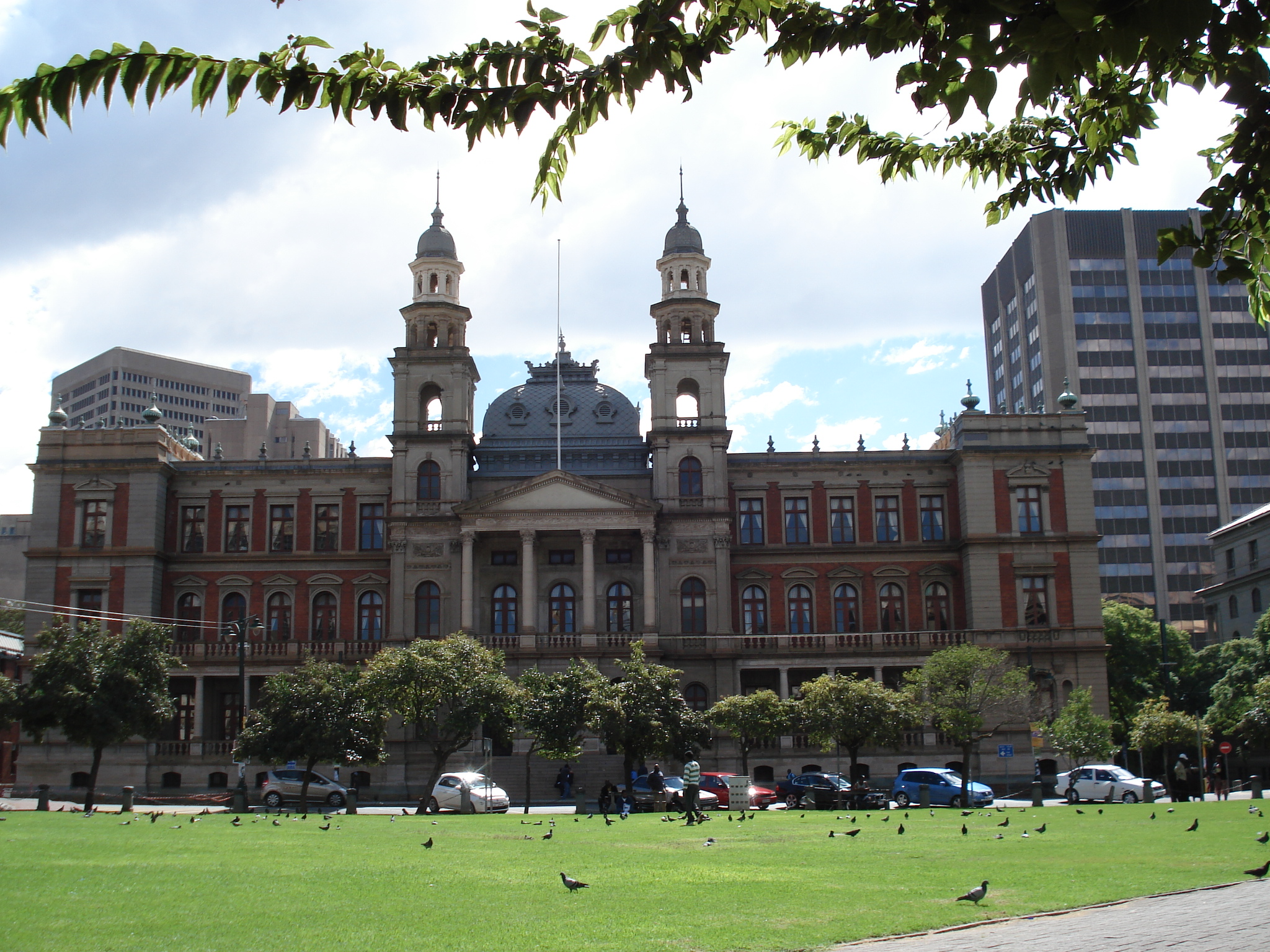
Palace of Justice, Pretoria

- Palace of Justice – the magistrates court of Pretoria
- Oudtshoorn Ostrich Palaces – old residences of famous ostrich farmes
- uMgungundlovu – royal kraal of King Dingane of the Zulu Empire.

== Spain ==
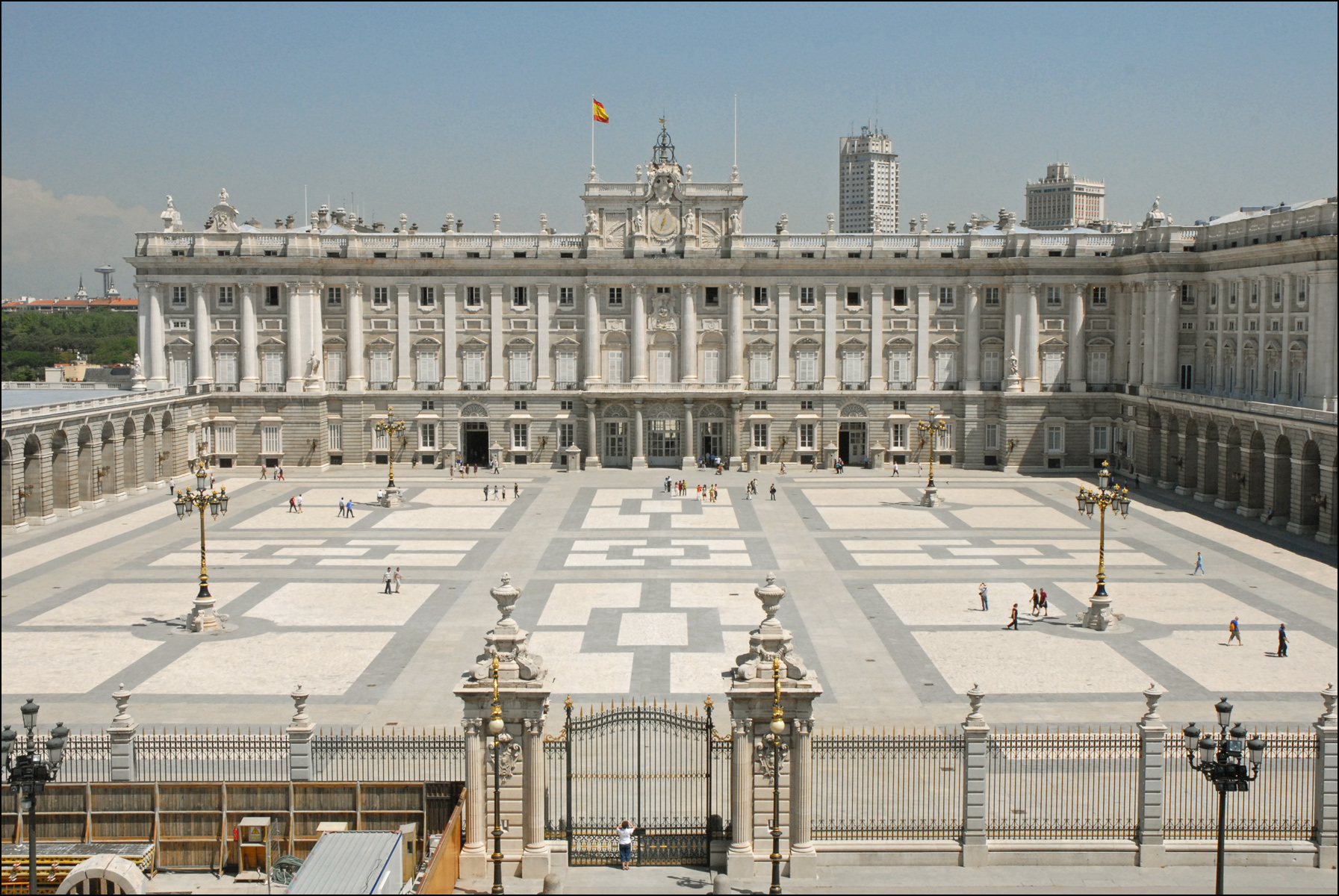
Palacio Real, Madrid

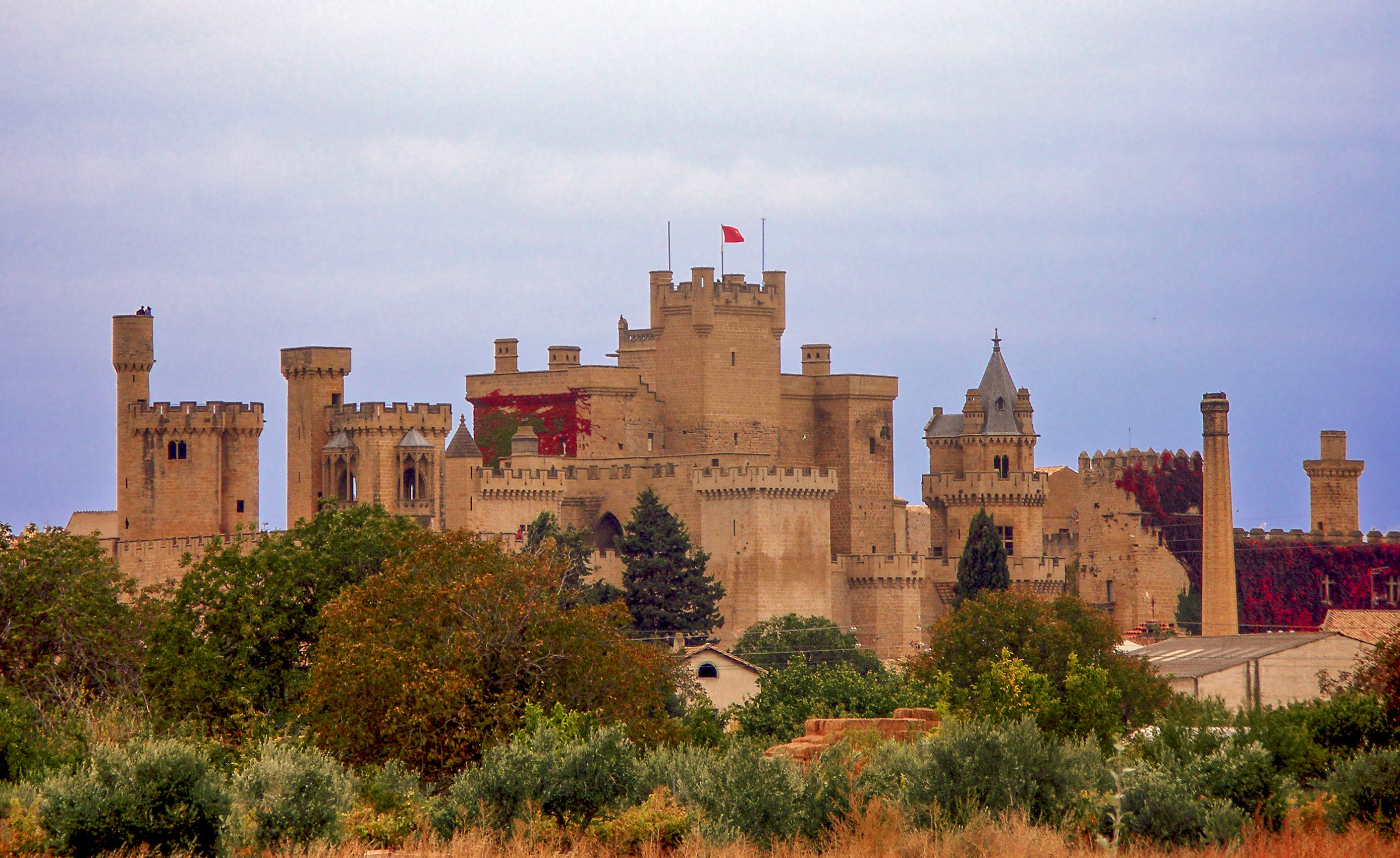
Olite palace

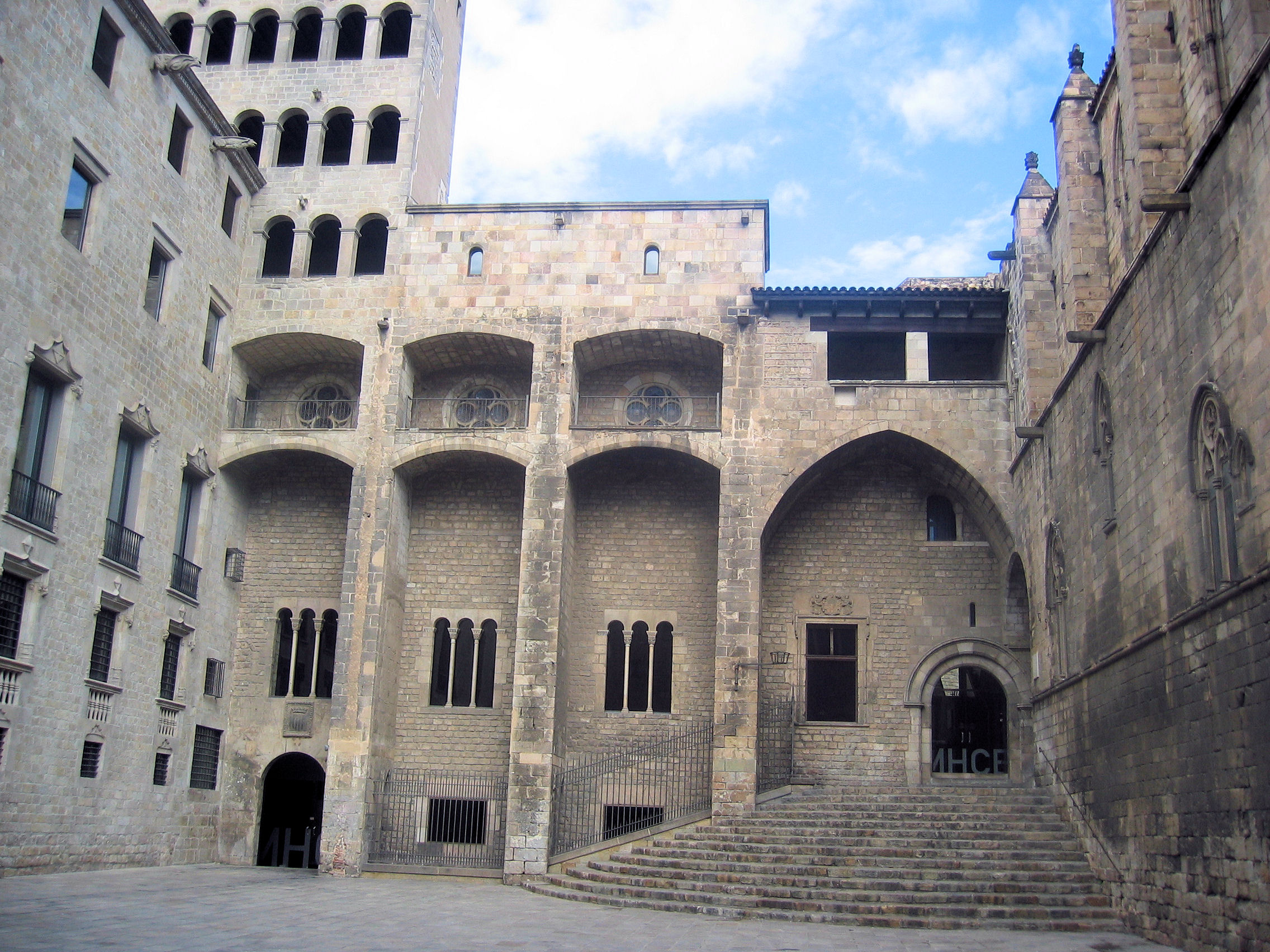
Palau Reial Major

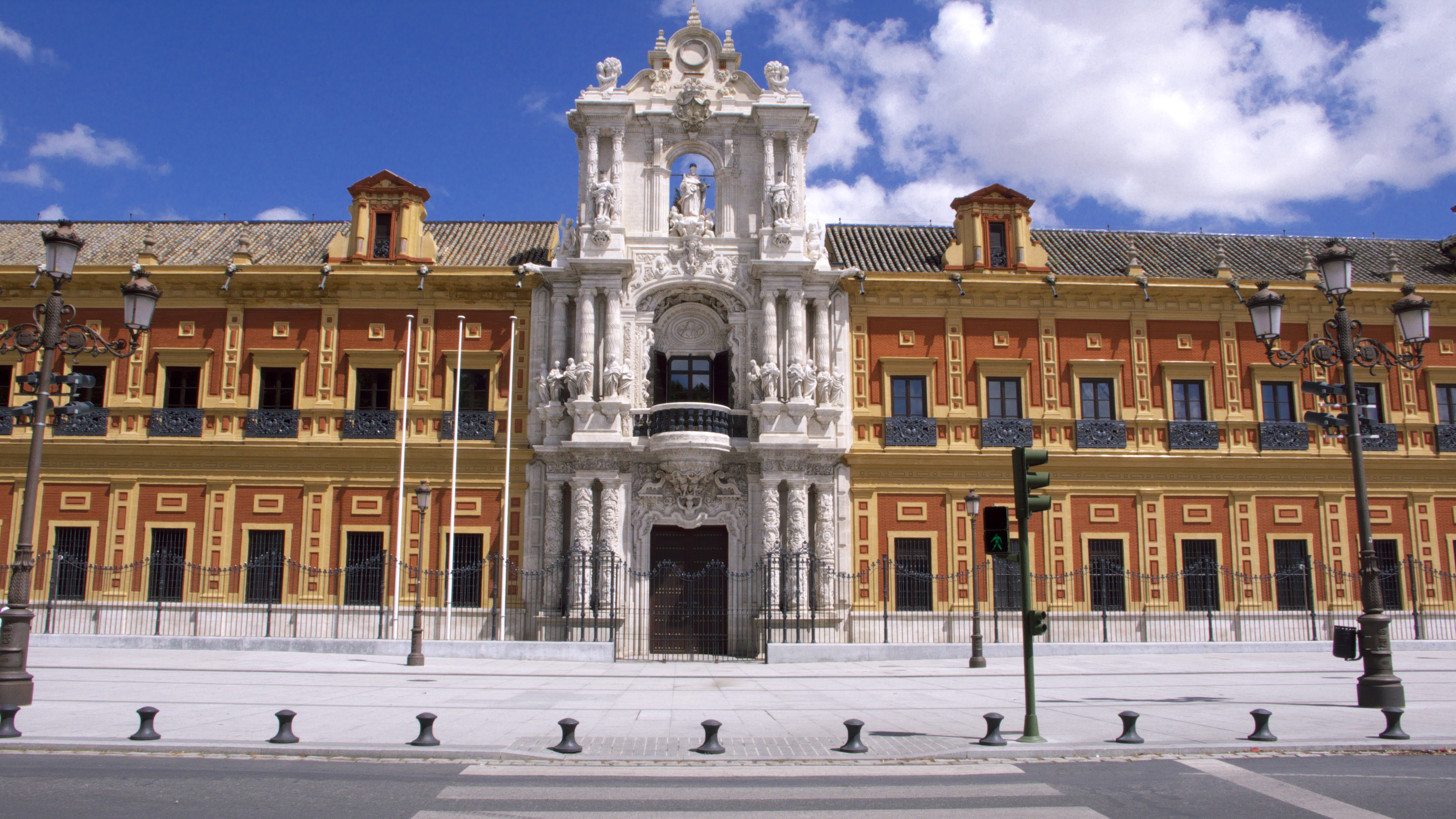
Palacio de San Telmo

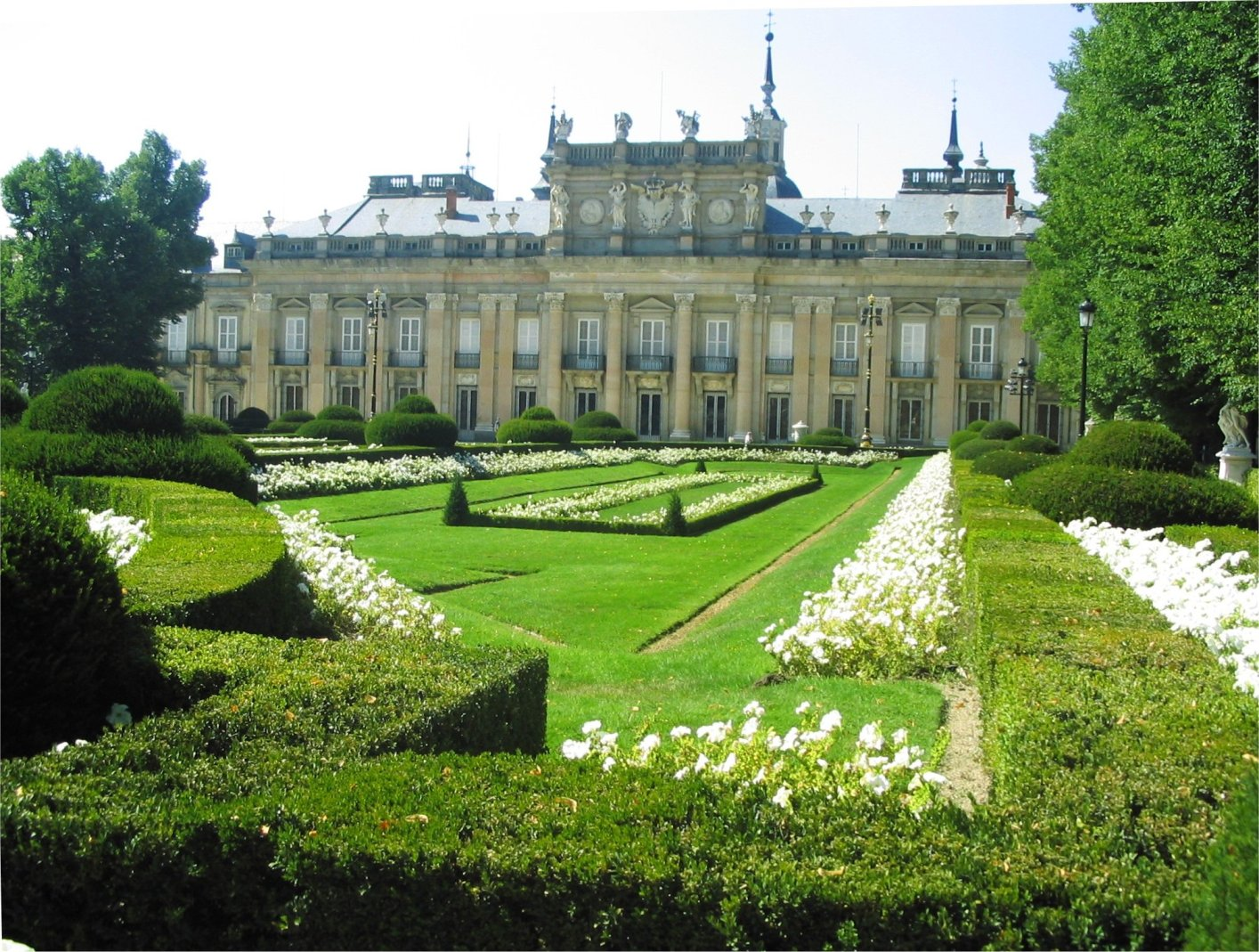
La Granja Palace

- Alcázar of Segovia
- Aljafería, (Zaragoza)
- Alhambra, Nasrid Palaces of La Alhambra
- Archbishop's Palace of Alcalá de Henares
- Buenavista Palace (Málaga)
- Casa de Pilatos, (Seville)
- Casa de las Torres
- Casa Salazar (La Laguna)
- Casa Solans, Saragossa
- Condes de Argillo Palace, (Morata de Jalón)
- Ducal Palace, (Lerma)
- El Escorial, Madrid
- Goyeneche Palace, (Nuevo Batzán)
- Liria Palace, (Madrid)
- Magalia Castle-Palace, (Las Navas del Marqués)
- Magdalena Palace, (Santander)
- Monasterio de las Descalzas Reales
- Olite Real Palace. Palace of the king of Navarre.
- Palaces and Royal Residences (Casa Real de España)
- Palacio Argensola
- Palacio de Almanzora
- Palacio de Arbaizenea
- Palacio de Ayerbe
- Palacio de la Aduana
- Palacio de Comunicaciones de Madrid
- Palace of Charles V
- Palacio de las Cigüeñas
- Palacio de los Condes de Gomara (Soria)
- Palace of the Countess of Lebrija (Sevilla)
- Palace of Condes de Cirat, (Almansa)
- Palace of las Dueñas
- Palacio de las Dueñas (Sevilla)
- Palacio Duque de Abrantes
- Palacio Episcopal de Astorga
- Palacio Episcopal de Cáceres
- Palacio de Fuenclara, (Zaragoza)
- Palacio de los Golfines de Abajo
- Palacio de los Guzmanes
- Palace of Infante don Luis, (Boadilla del Monte)
- Palace of Infantado, (Guadalajara)
- Palacio Longoria
- Palacio del Marqués de Ferrera (Avilés)
- Palacio del Maruqués de Santa Cruz, (Viso del Marques)
- Palau Reial Major, Barcelona
- Palacio Real de Aranjuez, Madrid
- Palacio Real de El Pardo, Madrid
- Palacio Real de Miramar, San Sebastián
- Palacio de la Moncloa, the residence of the Prime Minister.
- Palacio Real de La Almudaina
- Palacio Real de La Granja de San Ildefonso
- Palacio Real de Riofrío
- Palace of San Telmo, Seville
- Palacio de Sobrellano, (Comillas)
- Palacio de Yanduri (Sevilla)
- Palacio de la Zarzuela – Private residence of the Monarchs of Spain
- Palau de la Generalitat de Catalunya
- Palau Güell
- Real Monasterio de La Encarnación
- Real Monasterio Santa Clara de Tordesillas
- Real Monasterio Santa María La Real de las Huelgas
- Royal Palace of Madrid – official residence of the Monarchs of Spain; and largest royal palace in Western Europe
- Royal Alcazars of Seville
- Valladolid Royal Palace

== Sri Lanka ==
- Sigiriya – former royal residence & court of King Kasyapa
- Royal Palace of Kandy – last royal residence, Kingdom of Kandy

== Sweden ==
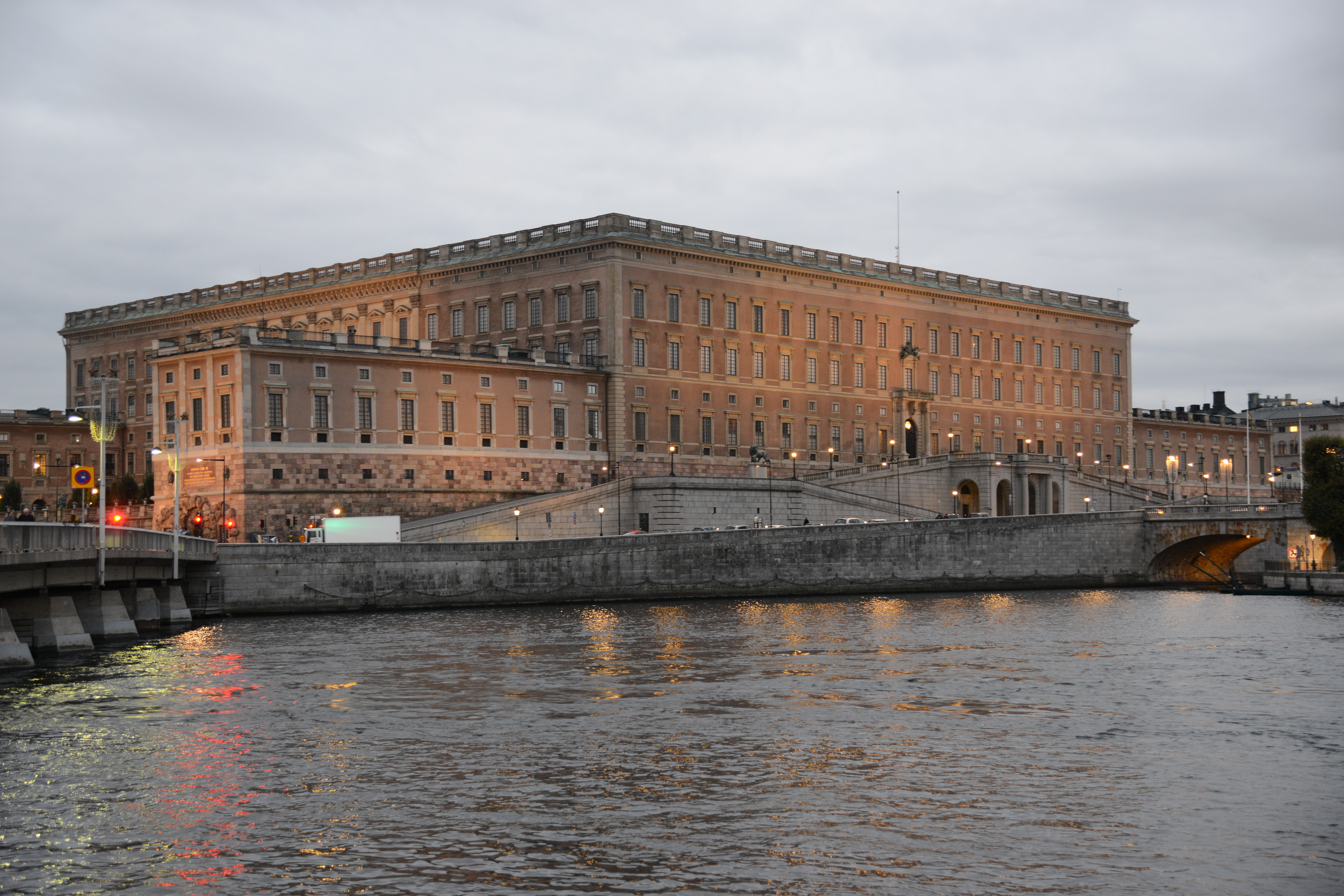
The Royal Palace in Stockholm

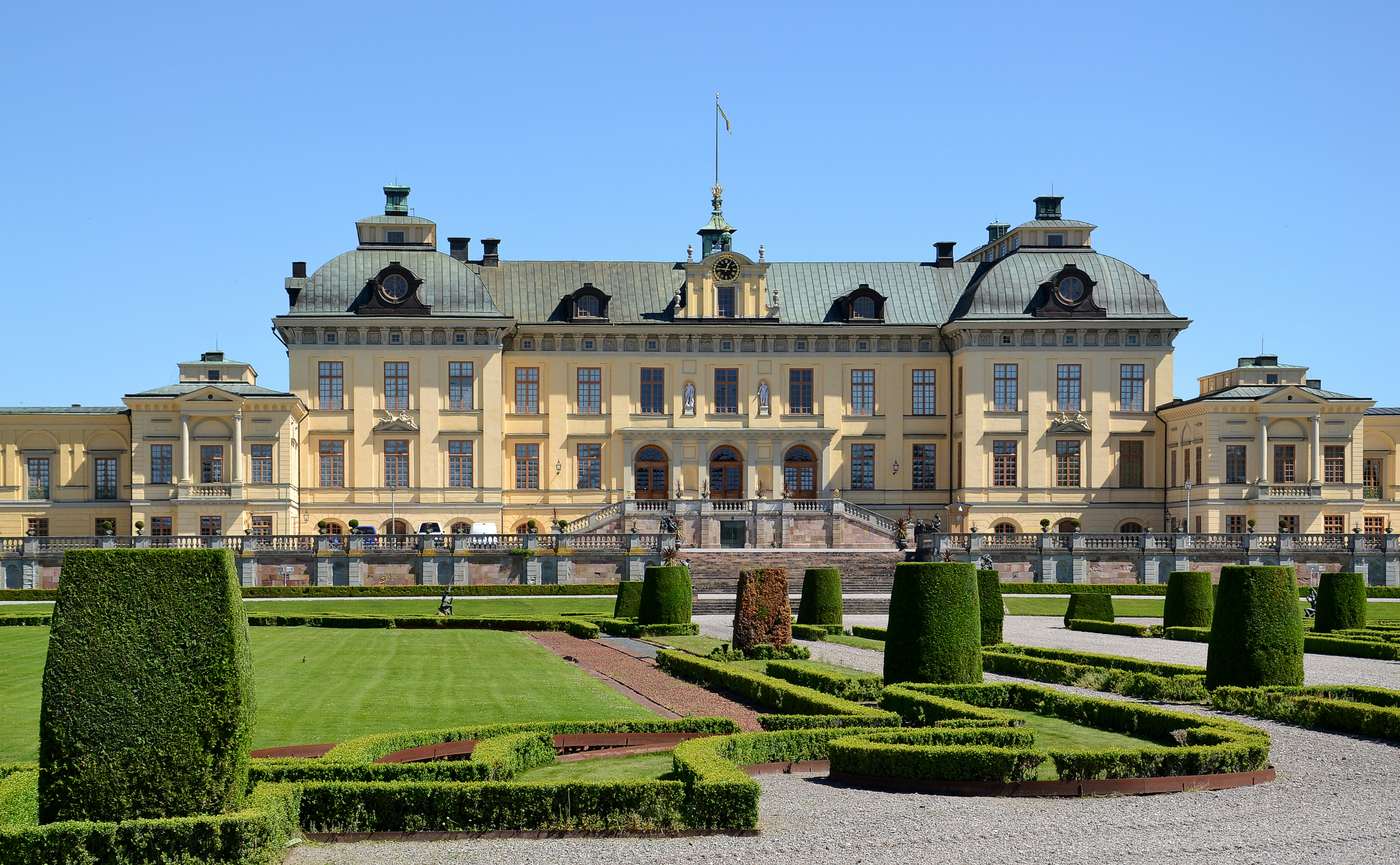
Drottningholm Palace

- Drottningholm Palace – Private residence of the Swedish royal family, Drottningholm
- Gripsholm Castle – royal residence, Mariefred
- Palace of Bonde – former noble residence, today seat of the Supreme Court, Stockholm
- Rosendal Palace – royal residence
- Rosersberg Palace – royal residence
- Stockholm Palace (Stockholms slott) – official residence of the Swedish monarch
- Strömsholm Palace – royal residence
- Tullgarn Palace – royal residence
- Ulriksdal Palace – royal residence
- Skoklosters slott – former noble residence, today museum

=== Skåne ===
The province of Skåne (Scania) in southernmost Sweden is well known for its many castles.

- Malmöhus Castle, Malmö
- Landskrona Citadel, Landskrona (includes one of the world's best preserved moat system)
- Kärnan, Helsingborg, very old tower from the 12th century
- Glimmingehus, close to Simrishamn
- Sofiero Palace, Helsingborg, summer residence of king Gustav VI Adolf
- Trolleholm Castle, close to Eslöv
- Trollenäs Castle, also close to Eslöv
- Örenäs Castle, the youngest castle in Sweden, from 1903
- Krapperup Castle, close to Höganäs
- Svaneholm Castle
- Christinehof Castle
- Bosjökloster
- Övedskloster Castle
- Kulla Gunnarstorp Castle
- Vrams Gunnarstorp Castle
- Borgeby Castle
- Trolle-Ljungby Castle

== Syria ==
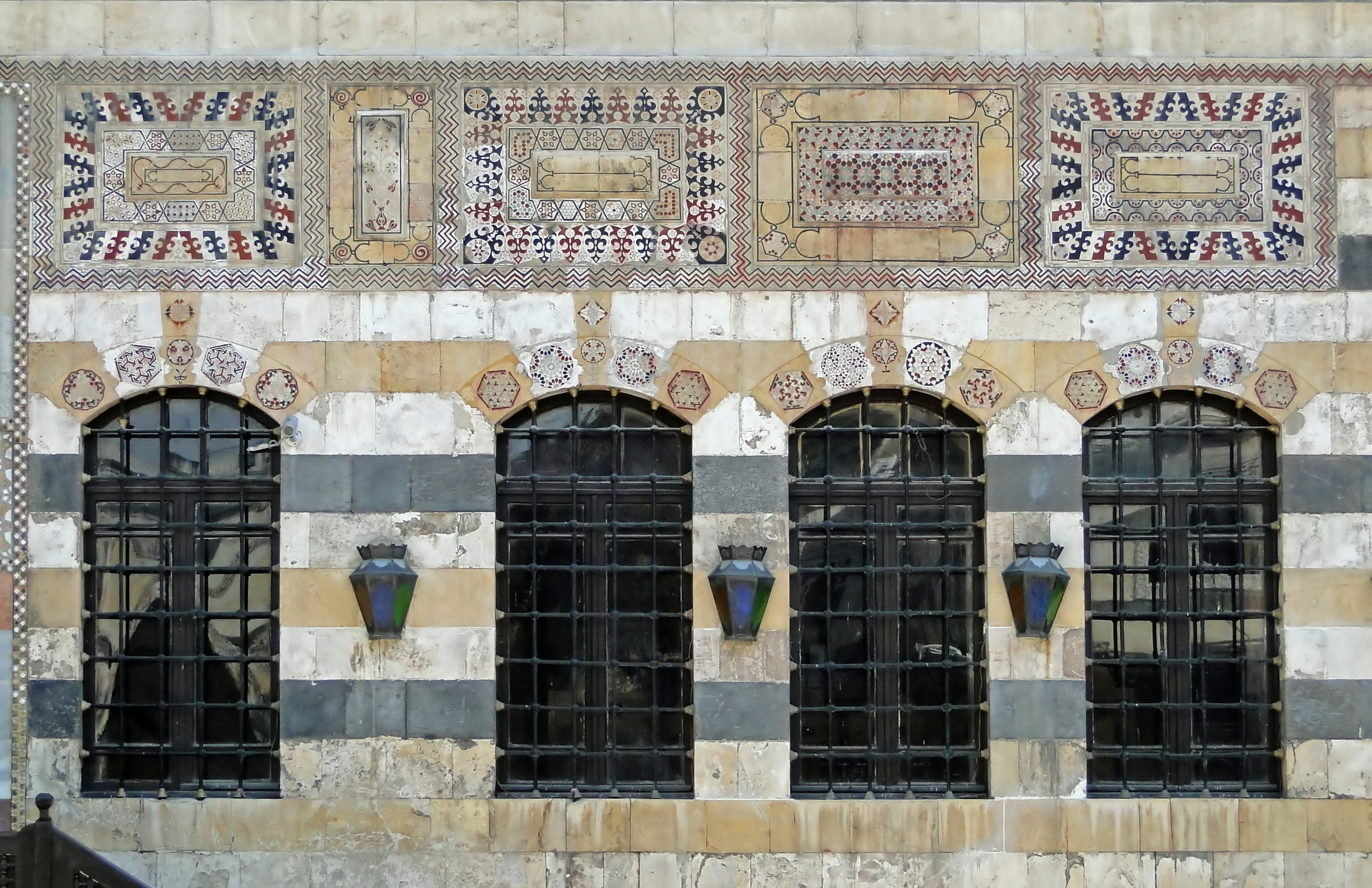
Facade of the Azm Palace of Damascus

- Presidential Palace, Damascus
- Tishreen Palace, Damascus
- Azm Palace, Damascus
- Azm Palace, Hama
- Qasr al-Hayr al-Gharbi
- Qasr al-Hayr al-Sharqi
- Royal Palace of Mari
- Royal Palace of Ugarit

== Taiwan ==
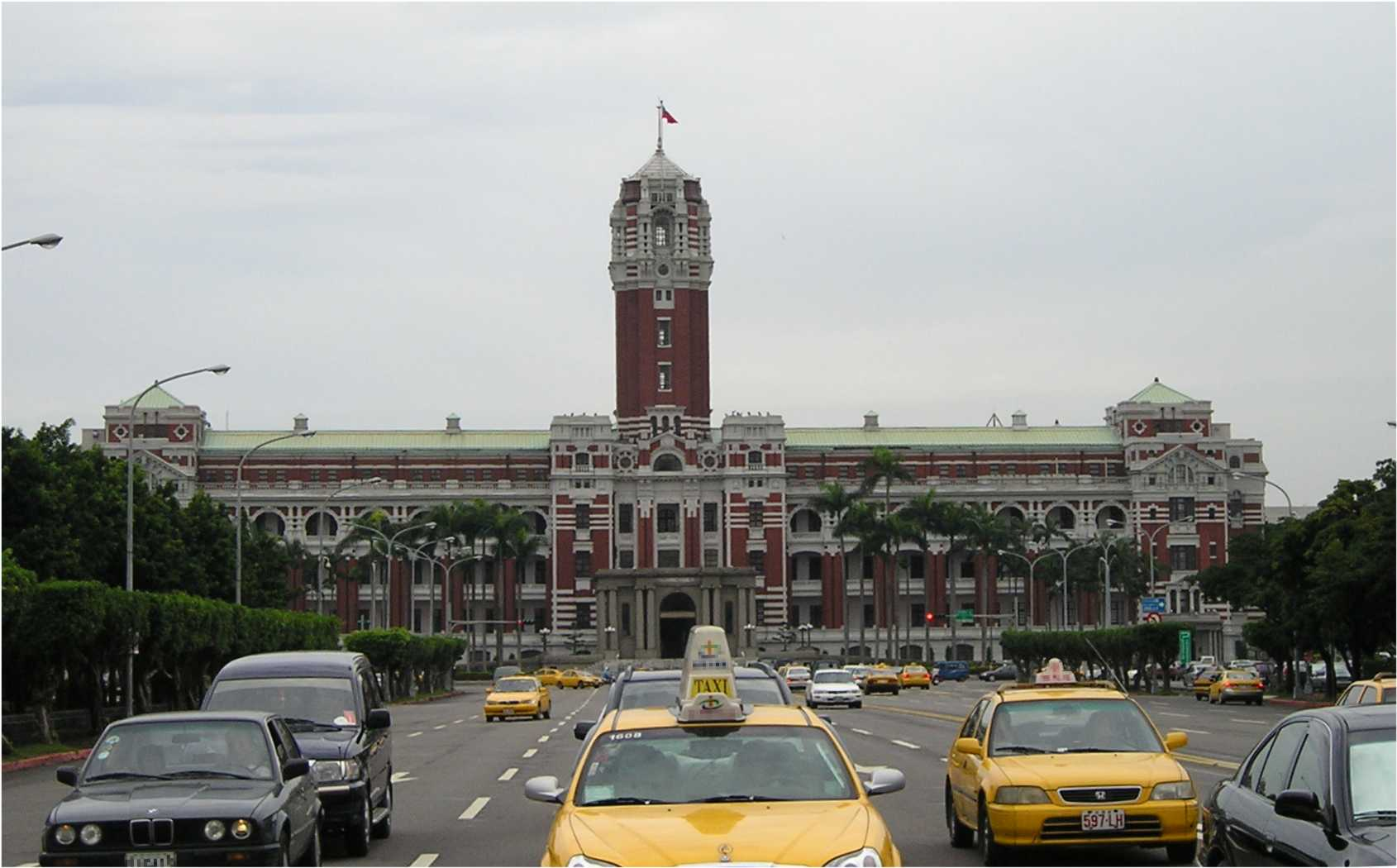
Presidential Office Building, Taipei

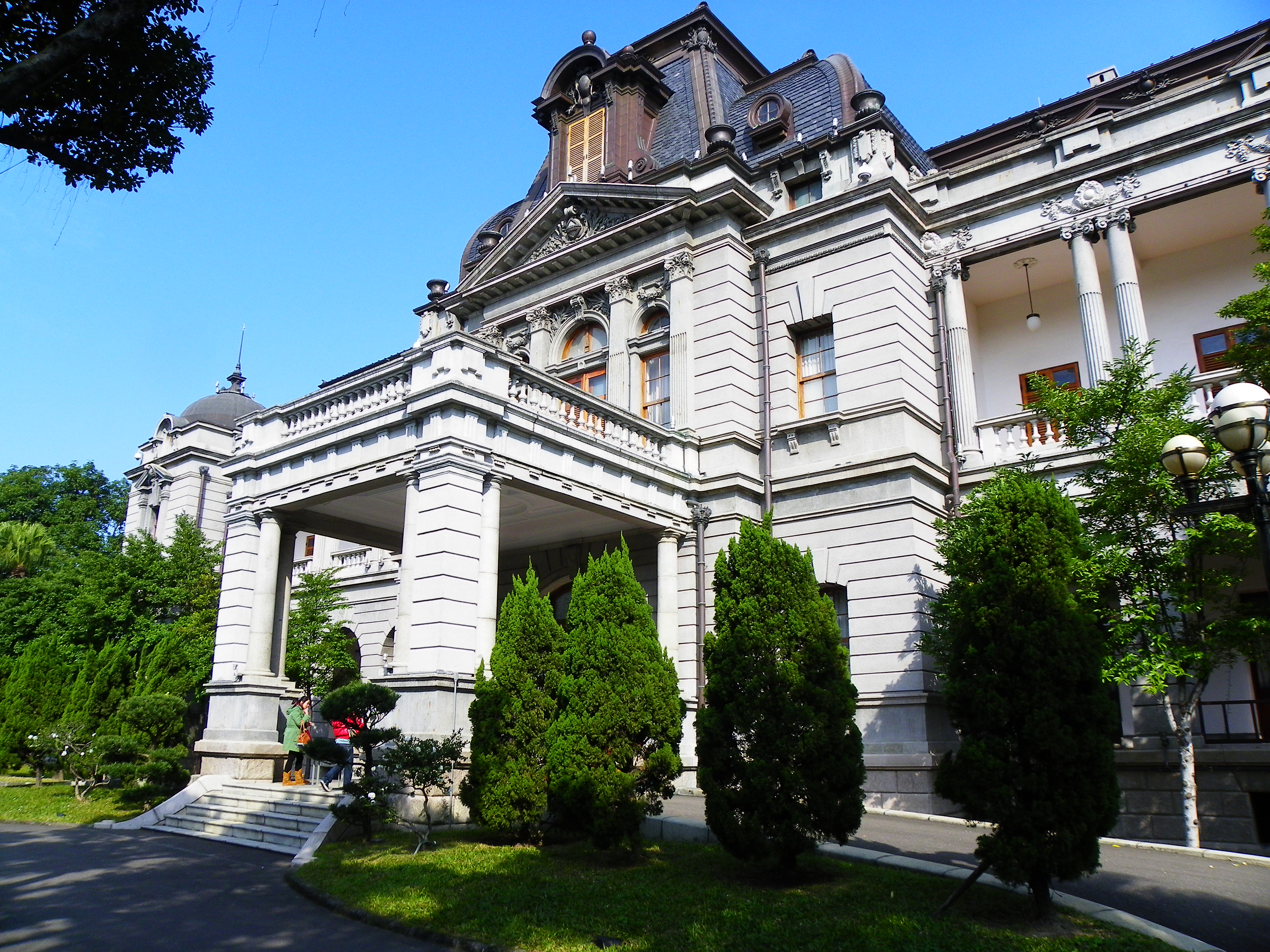
Taipei Guest House, Taipei

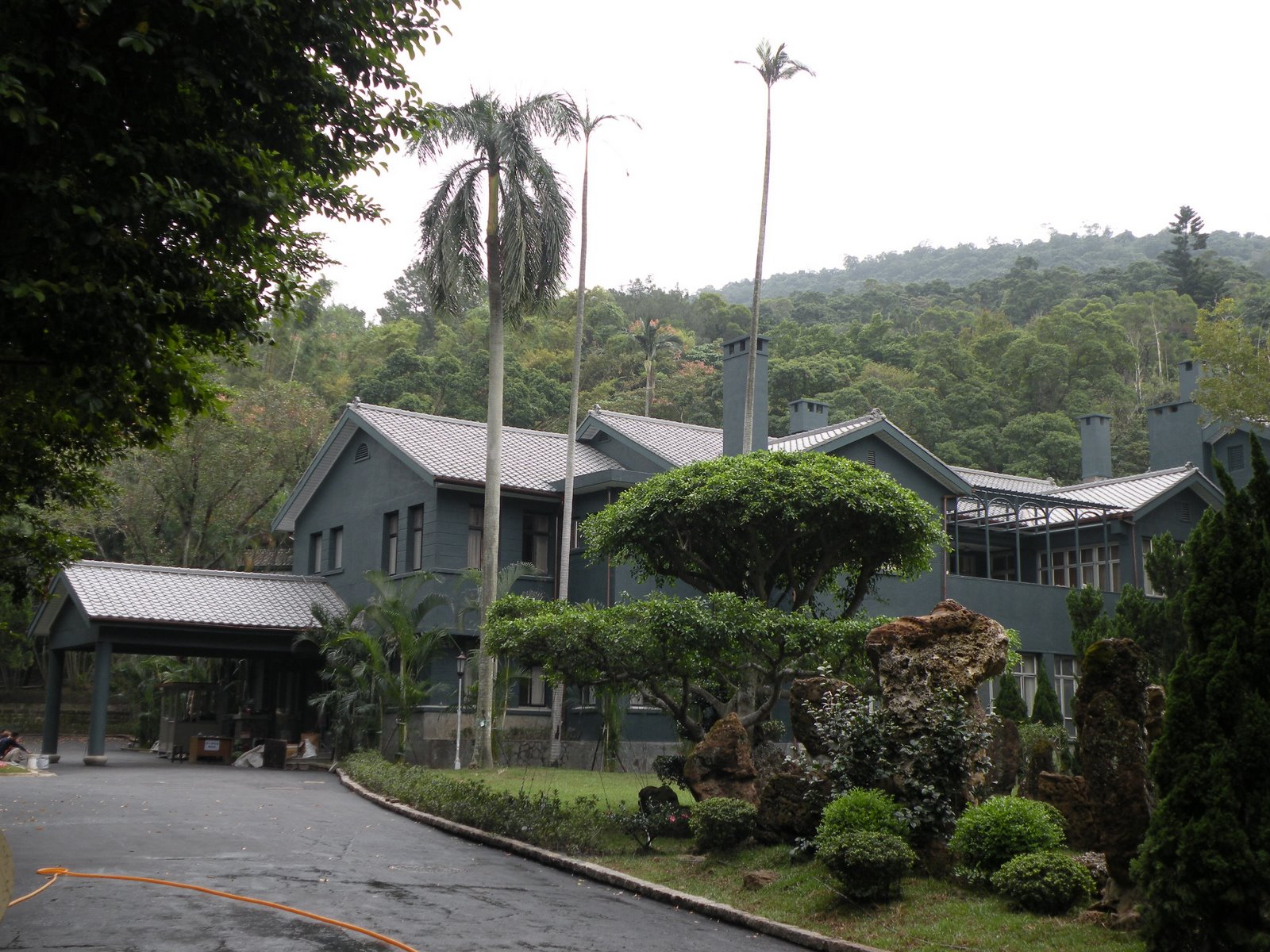
Shilin Official Residence

- Fort Zeelandia – former residence for Governor of Dutch Formosa and Prince of Yanping under the Kingdom of Tungning, Tainan.
- Fort Santo Domingo and Fort San Salvador – Governor of Spanish Formosa.
- Qing Dynasty Taiwan Provincial Administration Hall – former site of the Qing dynasty government yamen that ruled Taiwan.
- Presidential Office Building, Taipei – originally built as the Office of the Governor-General of Taiwan during the period of Japanese rule
- Taipei Guest House – former Governor-General of Taiwan's Residence
- Shilin Official Residence – residence of President Chiang Kai-shek
- Seven Seas Residence – residence of President Chiang Ching-kuo
- Official Residence of the President of the Republic of China – de facto official residence since President Lee Teng-hui

== Tanzania ==
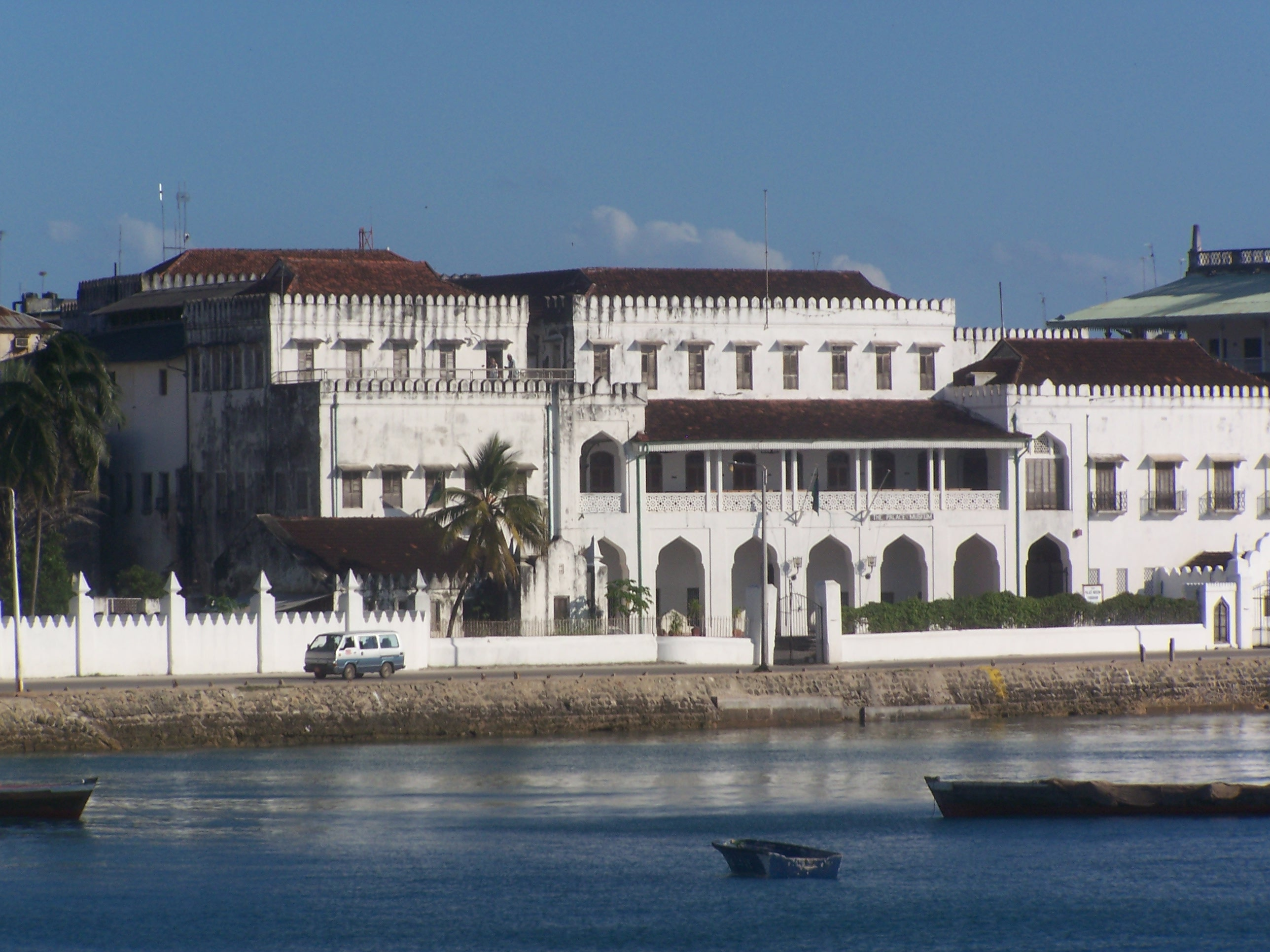
Sultan Palace in Zanzibar.

- Palace of Husuni Kubwa, Kilwa
- Palace of Husuni Ndogo, Kilwa
- Sutan's Palace, Zanzibar

== Thailand ==
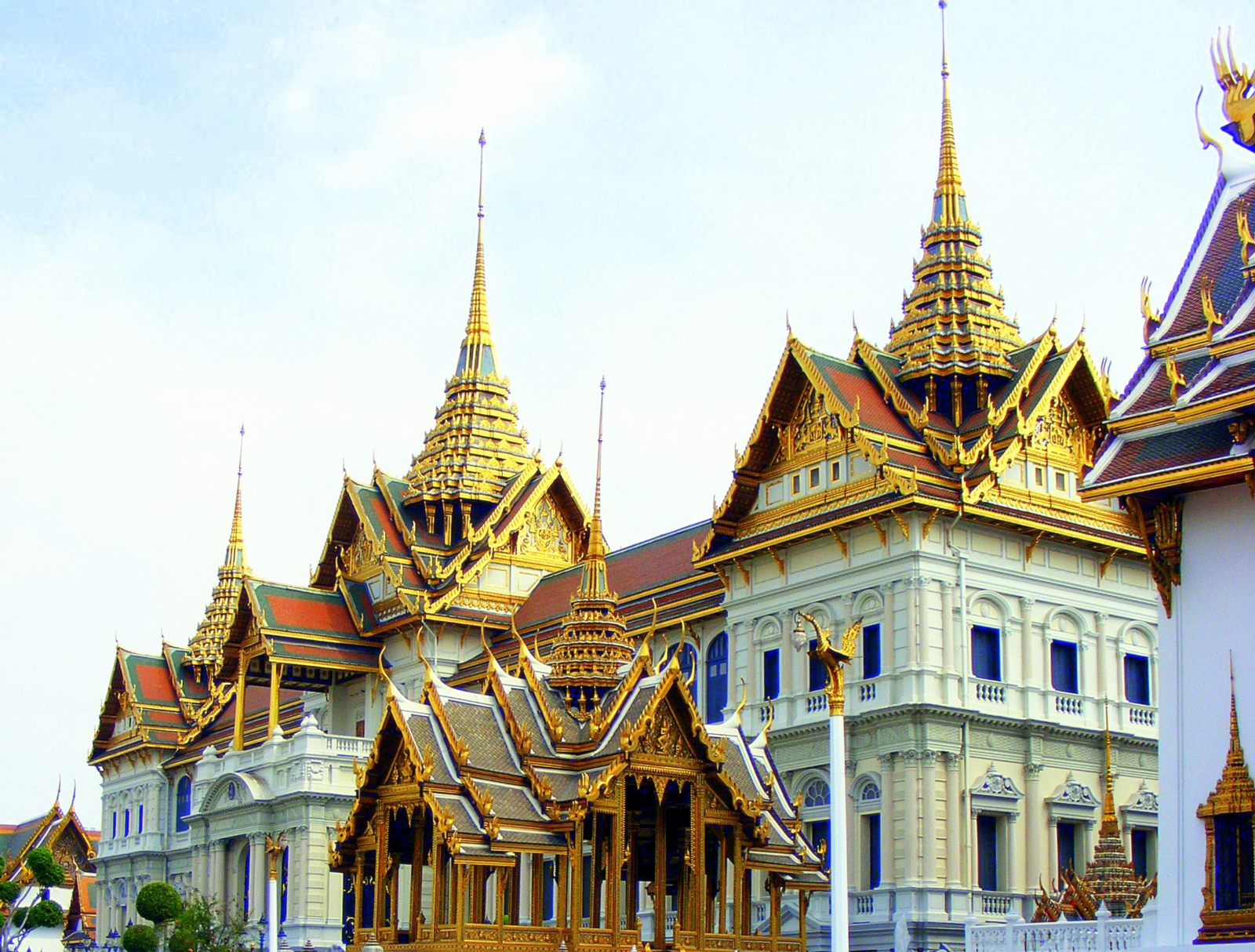
Grand Palace, Bangkok

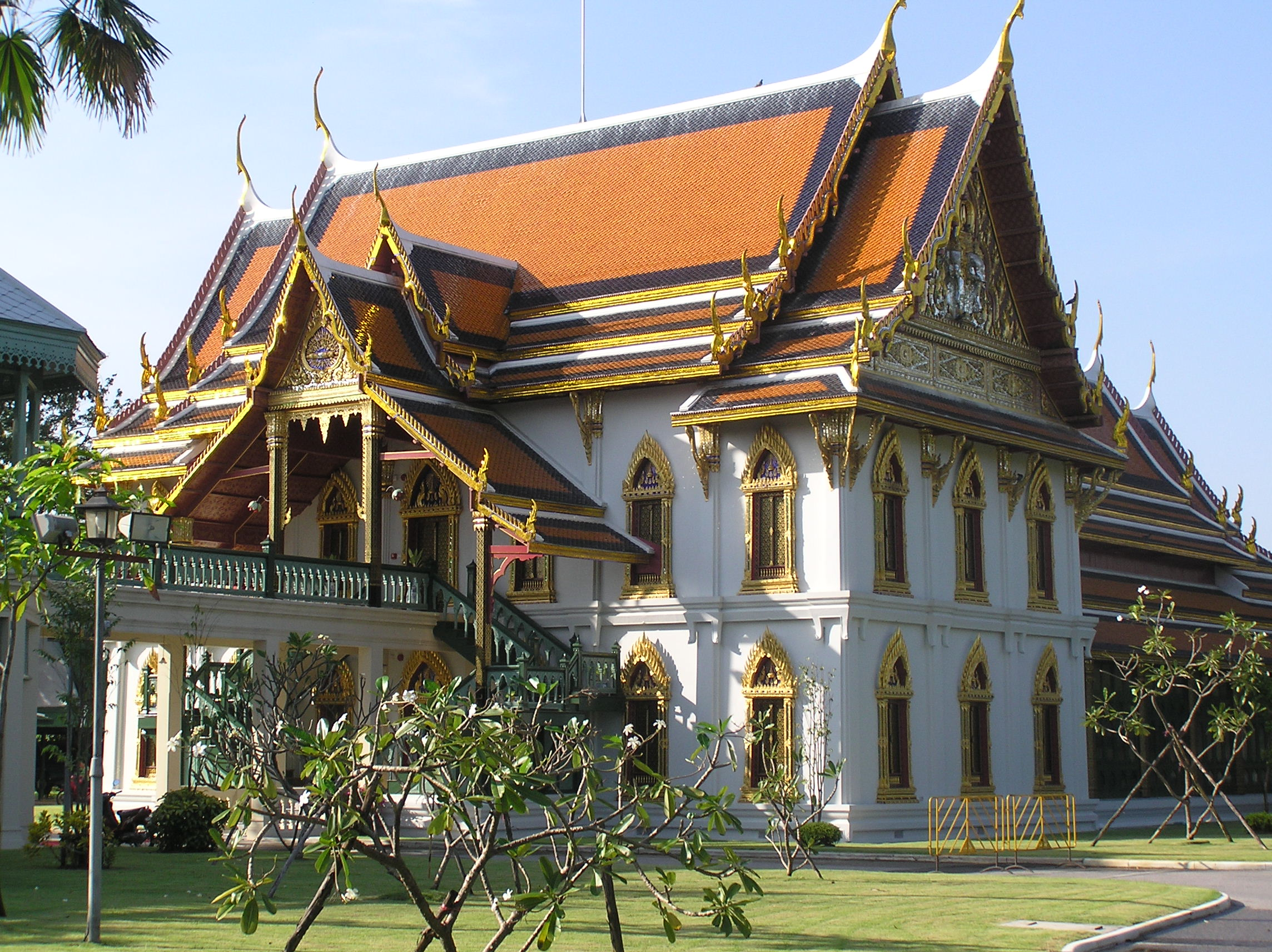
Sanamchan Palace, Nakhon Pathom

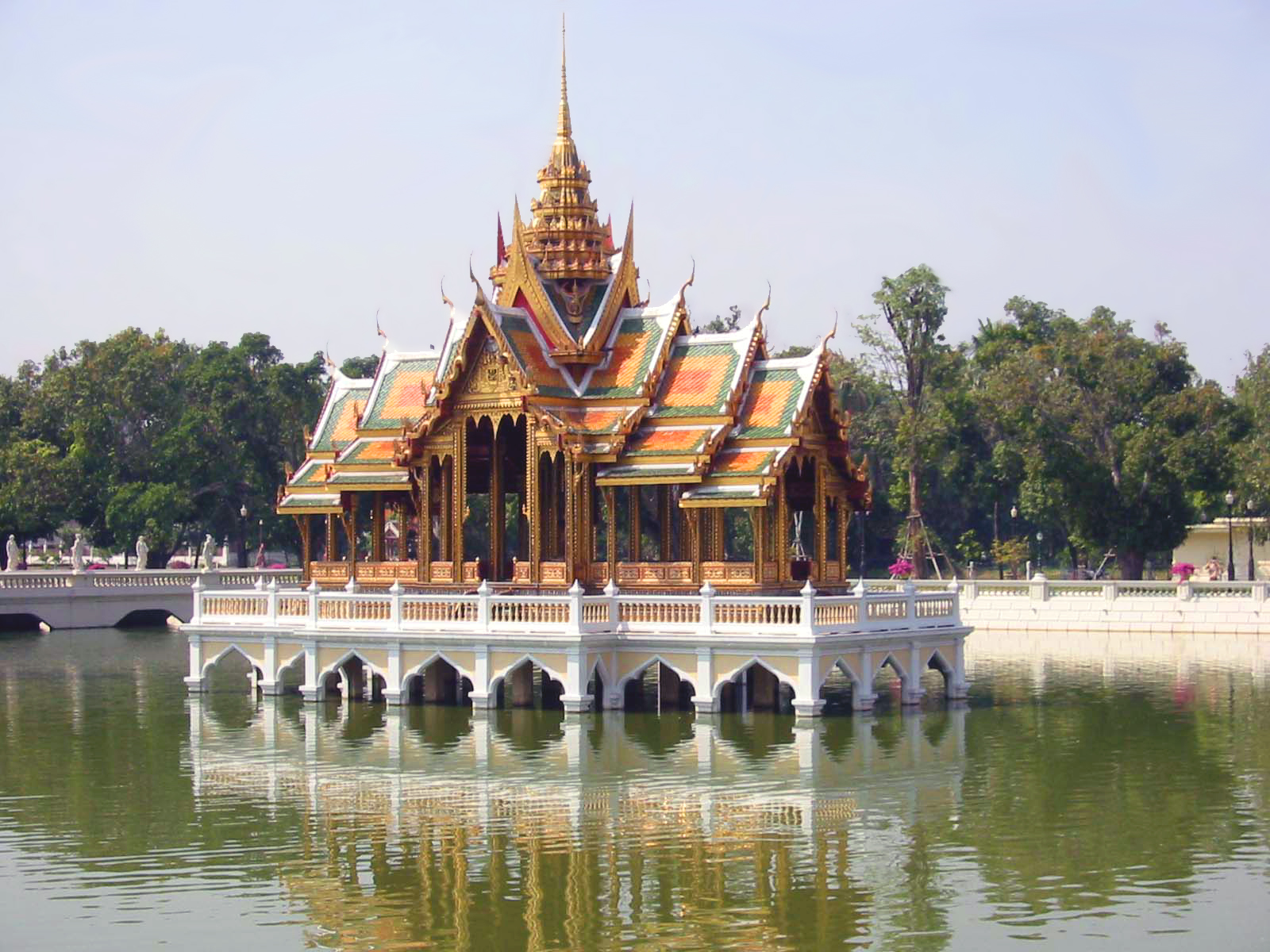
Bang Pa-In Royal Palace, Ayutthaya Province

- Ancient Grand Palace (พระราชวังโบราณ) – Former Main Palace of the Ayutthaya Kingdom, Ayutthaya
- Baan Puen Palace (พระรามราชนิเวศน์) – Phetchaburi
- Bang Pa-In Royal Palace (พระราชวังบางปะอิน) – Summer Palace, Ayutthaya
- Bang Khun Phrom Palace (วังบางขุนพรหม) – currently, as the Bank of Thailand, Bangkok
- Bhuban Palace (พระตำหนักภูพานราชนิเวศน์) – royal residence, Sakon Nakhon Province
- Bhubing Palace (พระตำหนักภูพิงราชนิเวศน์) – royal residence, Chiang Mai
- Burapha Phirom Palace (วังบูรพาภิรมย์) – currently, as a market, Bangkok
- Chakrabongse Palace (วังจักรพงษ์) – currently, as a private resort, Bangkok
- Chakri Bongkot Palace (พระตำหนักจักรีบงกช) – Private residence of the Thai royal family, Bangkok
- Chankasem Palace (วังจันทรเกษม)
- Derm Palace (พระราชวังเดิม) or Thon Buri Palace – It was the palace of King Taksin, now used as HQ of Royal Thai Navy
- Doi Tung Palace (พระตำหนักดอยตุง) – royal residence, Chiang Rai
- Dusit Palace (พระราชวังดุสิต) – Private residence of the Thai royal family, Bangkok
  - Chitralada Palace (พระตำหนักจิตรลดารโหฐาน) (New Palace) – Private residence of the Thai royal family, Bangkok
  - Vimanmek Palace (พระที่นั่งวิมานเมฆ) (Vimanmek Mansion) – former royal residence, Bangkok
- Front Palace (พระราชวังบวรสถานมงคล) – currently, as Bangkok National Museum, Bangkok
- Grand Palace, Bangkok (พระบรมมหาราชวัง) – official residence of the King of Thailand, Bangkok
- Kham Yat Palace – (พระตำหนักคำหยาด) residence of King Boromakot of Ayutthaya (r. 1733–1758)
- King Narai's Palace (พระนารายณ์ราชนิเวศน์) – Lopburi
- Klai Kangwon Palace (วังไกลกังวล) – royal residence, King Rama IX likes there, Hua Hin
- Le Dix Palace (พระตำหนักเลอดิศ) – Private residence of the Thai royal family, Bangkok
- Marukatayawan Summer Palace (พระราชนิเวศน์มฤคทายวัน) – Phetchaburi
- Nakorn Luang Palace (ปราสาทนครหลวง) – Nakorn Luang, Ayutthaya
- Nonthaburi Palace (พระตำหนักนนทบุรี) – former private residence of the Thai royal family, Bangkok
- Phanakornkiri Palace (พระราชวังพระนครคีรี) – Phetchaburi
- Phetchabun Palace (วังเพ็ชรบูรณ์) – currently, as CentralWorld, Bangkok
- Phya Thai Palace (พระราชวังพญาไท) – Bangkok
- Rear Palace (พระราชวังบวรสถานพิมุข) – It is now a part of Siriraj Hospital, Bangkok
- Sanamchan Palace (พระราชวังสนามจันทร์) – King Rama VI's Palace, Nakhon Pathom
- Saranrom Palace (พระราชวังสราญรมย์) – currently, as a Saranrom Park, Bangkok
- Siriyalai Palace (พระตำหนักสิริยาลัย) – private residence of the Thai royal family, Ayutthaya
- Sa Pathum Palace (วังสระปทุม) – private residence of the Thai royal family, Bangkok
- Suan Pakard Palace (วังสวนผักกาด) – currently, as a museum, Bangkok
- Sukhothai Palace (วังศุโขทัย) – Private residence of the Thai royal family, Bangkok
- Taksin Palace (พระตำหนักทักษิณราชนิเวศน์) – royal residence, Narathiwat Province
- Thapra Palace (วังท่าพระ) – currently, as a university, Bangkok
- Tuk Palace – Ayutthaya Palace, Ayutthaya
- Waradit Palace (วังวรดิศ) – currently, as a museum, Bangkok

== Tonga ==
- Royal Palace, Tonga-Royal Palace of the Kingdom of Tonga is located in the northwest of the capital, Nukuʻalofa, close to the Pacific Ocean.

== Tunisia ==
- Abdellia Palace
- Bardo Palace
- Carthage Palace
- Carthage Royal Palace
- Dar al-Taj Palace
- Hammam-Lif Palace
- Ksar Saïd Palace
- Mohamedia Palace

== Türkiye ==
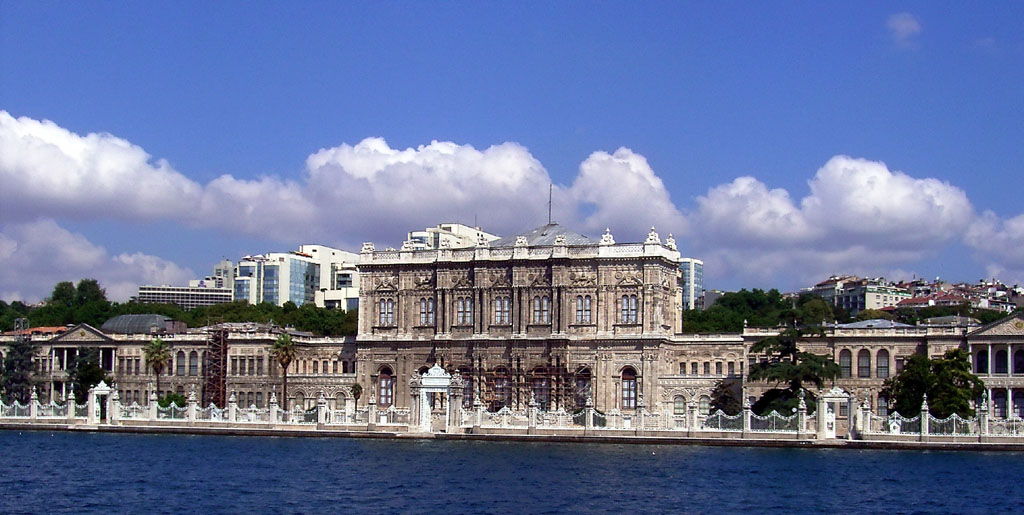
Dolmabahçe Palace, Istanbul

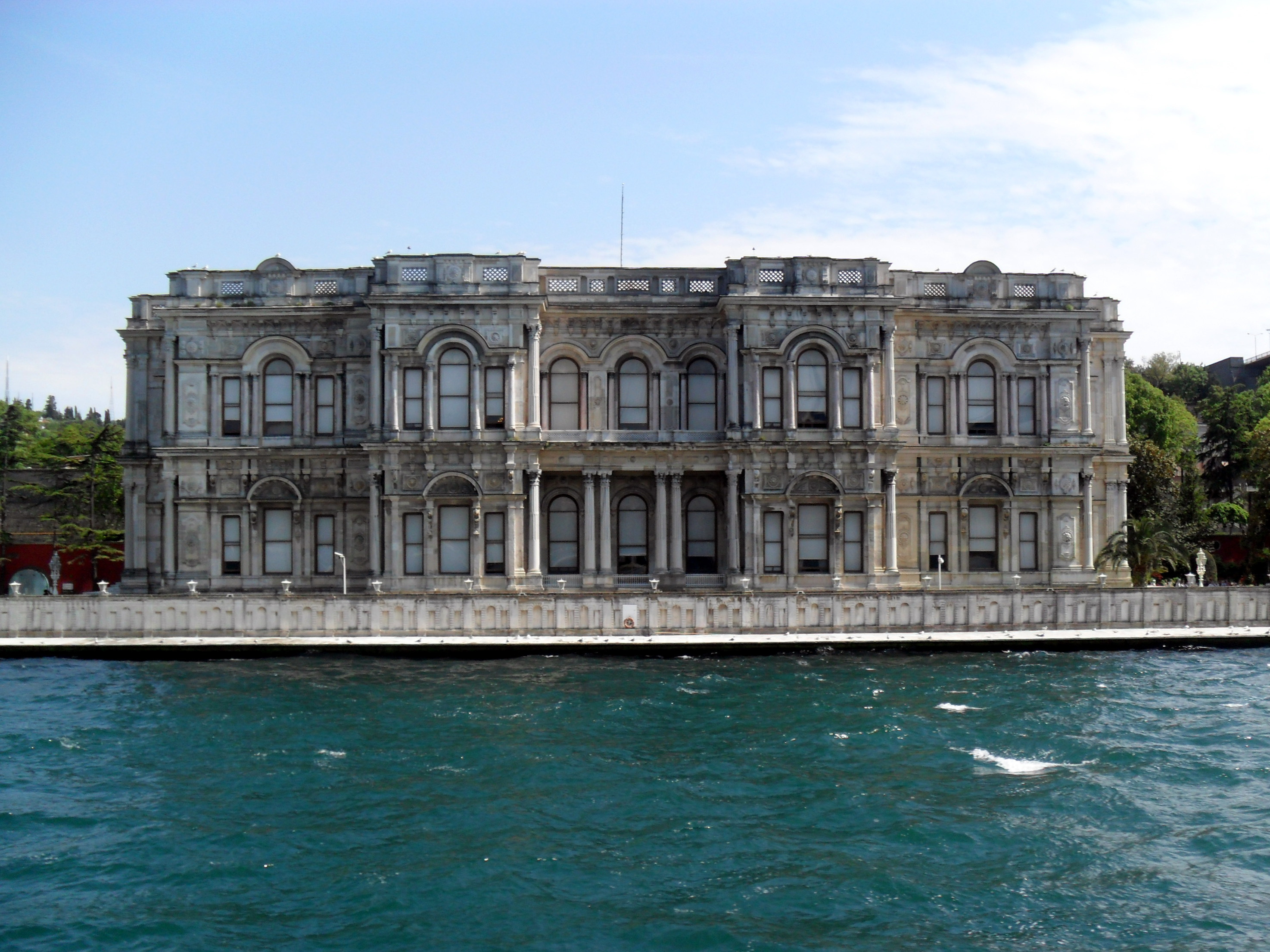
Beylerbeyi Palace, İstanbul

In Turkish, a palace is a Saray.

- Adile Sultan Palace – former royal residence
- Aynalıkavak Palace – former royal summer residence
- Beylerbeyi Palace – former royal summer residence
- Çırağan Palace – former royal residence, today hotel
- Dolmabahçe Palace – former residence of the Ottoman Royal Family, today state-guest house
- Edirne Palace – former royal residence
- Feriye Palace – former royal residence
- Hatice Sultan Palace – former residence of Hatice Sultan
- Ihlamur Palace – former royal summer residence
- İbrahim Paşa Palace – former royal residence
- Ishak Pasha Palace – former royal residence
- Khedive Palace – former royal summer residence
- Küçüksu Palace – former royal summer residence
- Maslak Palace – former royal summer residence
- Presidential Complex – one of the largest palaces in the world
- Tophane Palace – former royal residence
- Topkapı Palace – former residence of the Ottoman sultans
- Yıldız Palace – former royal residence
- Atik Pasha Palace – 19th century late Ottoman palace, former residence of the Admiral Atik Pasha, now part of the Four Seasons Hotel.

== Turkmenistan ==
- Rukhiyet Palace
- Türkmenbaşı Palace

== Ukraine ==
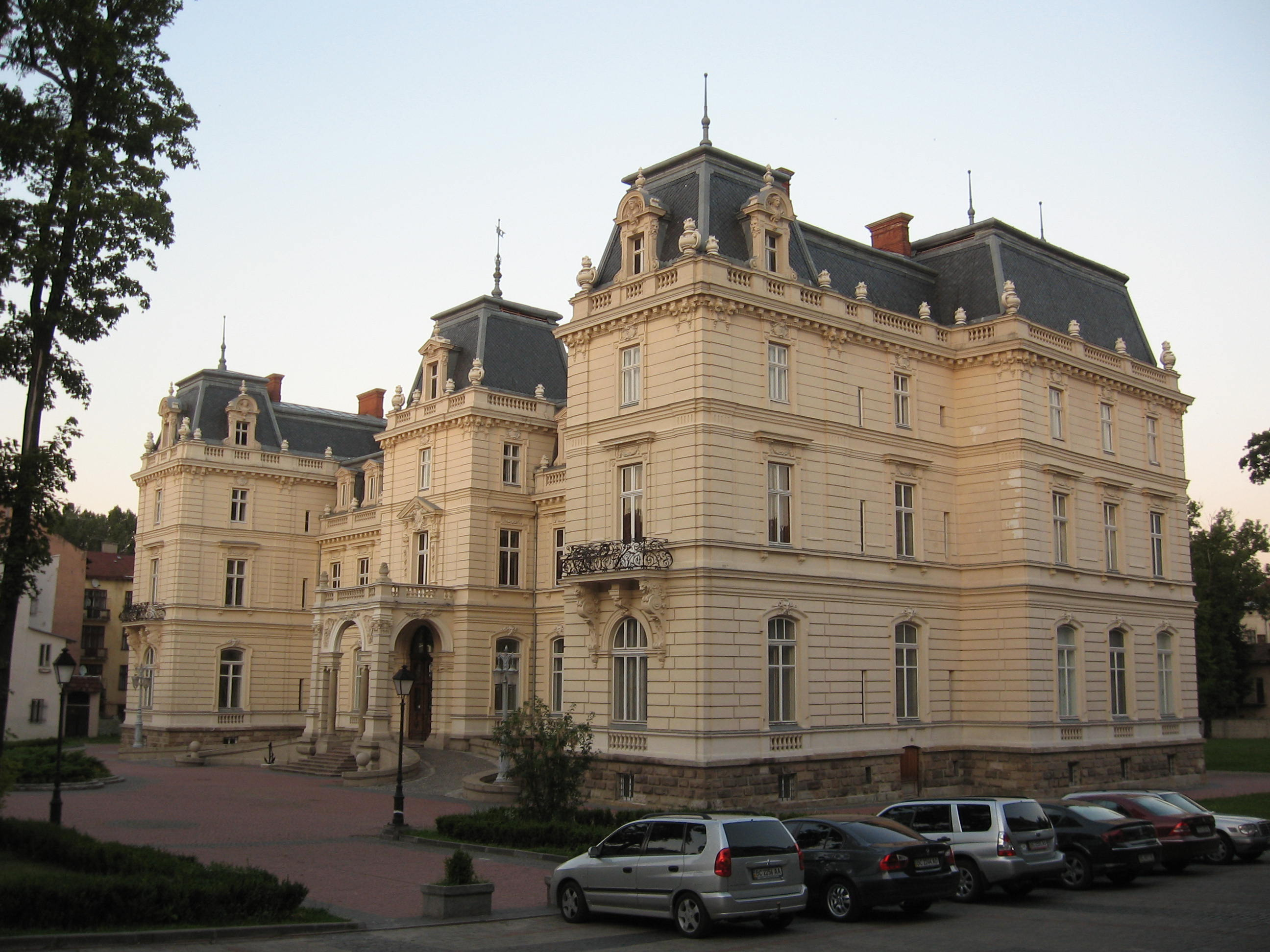
Potocki Palace, Lviv

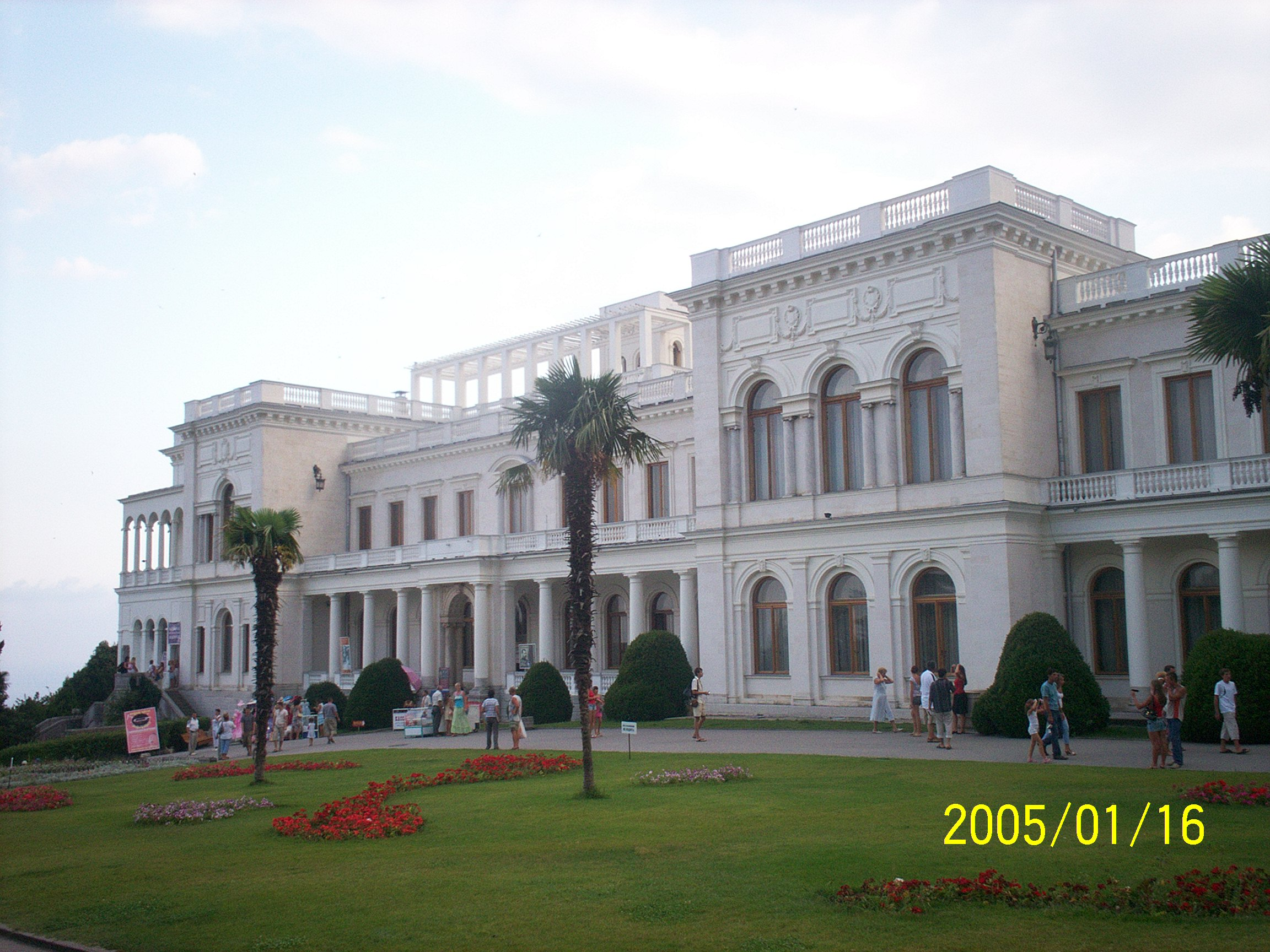
Livadia Palace

- Kyiv
  - Klovsky Palace
  - Mariinskyi Palace – residence of the president of Ukraine
- Crimea
  - Dulber Palace
  - Massandra Palace
  - Livadia Palace
  - Alupka Palace
  - Bakhchisaray Palace
  - Livadia Palace
  - Massandra
  - Yusupov Palace
- Dnipro
  - Potemkin's Palace
- Lviv
  - Royal Palace, Lviv
  - Lubomirski Palace, Lviv
  - Potocki Palace, Lviv
  - Sapieha Palace, Lviv
  - Metropolitan Palace, Lviv
  - Palazzo Bandinelli
- Lubomirski Palace in Dubno
- Pidhirtsi Palace
- Razumovsky Palace in Baturyn
- Kachanivka Palace
- Schönborn Palace in Chynadiievo
- Vorontsov Palace in Odesa
- Zolochiv Palace
- Zhovkva Palace

== United Arab Emirates ==
- Abu Dhabi
  - Qasr Al Watan
  - Qasr Al Bateen
  - Qasr Al Musharif
- Dubai
  - Zabeel Palace
  - Nad Al Sheba Palace
- Sharjah
  - Qasr Al Badi'a
- Ajman
  - Qasr Al Zaher
- Umm al Qaywayn
  - Qasr Al Madar
- Ras al Khaimah
  - Qasr Al Dhait
- Fujairah
  - Sheikh Palace

== United States ==
=== Colorado ===
- Cliff Palace – ruins from a dwelling of the Ancient Pueblo People

=== District of Columbia ===
- White House – official residence of the president of the United States.
- Number One Observatory Circle – official residence of the vice president of the United States.

=== Florida ===
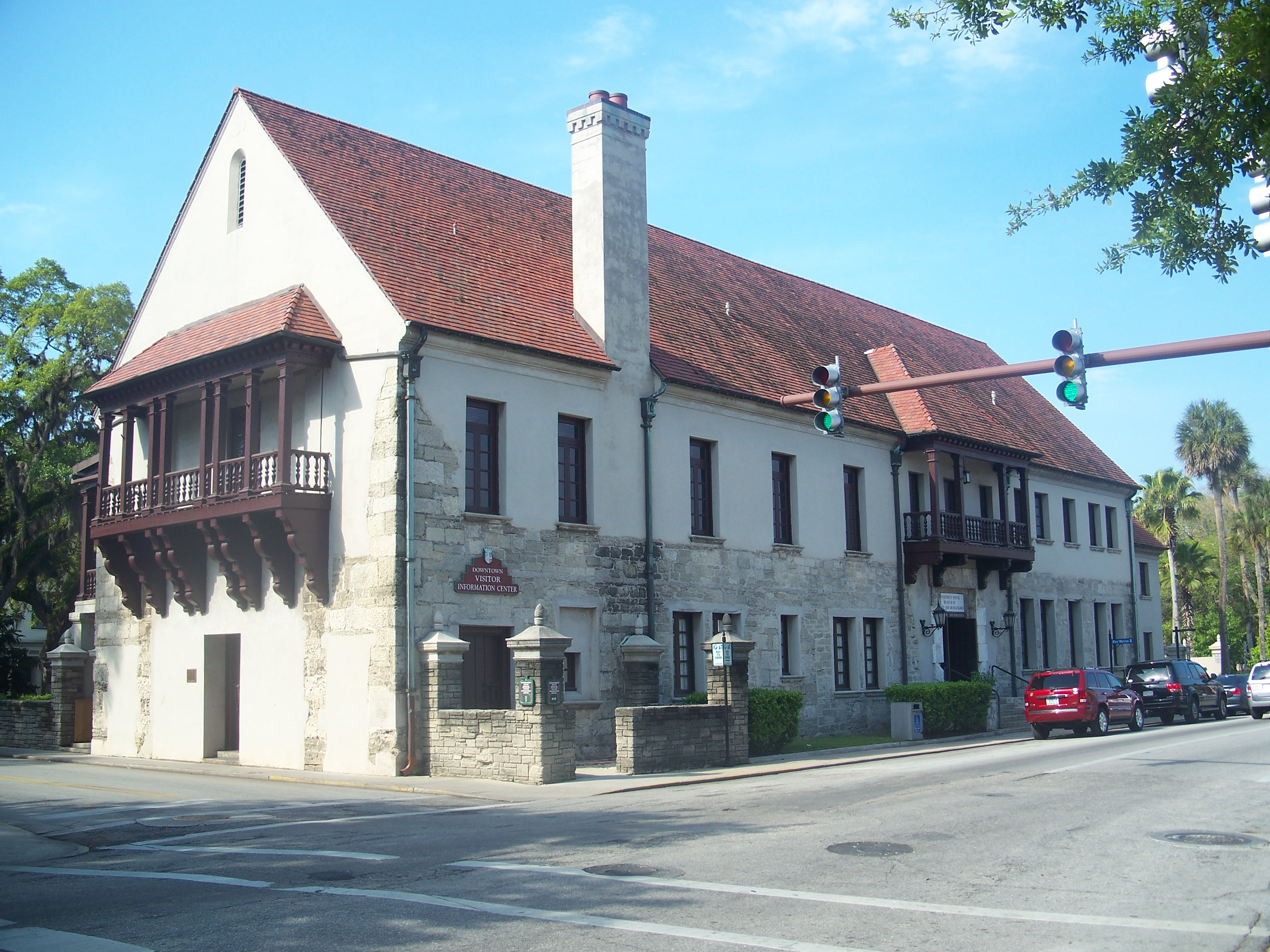
Government House, 2011

- Government House (St. Augustine) – official residence of the governors of La Florida, a territory of the Viceroyalty of New Spain, as well as the British colony of East Florida.

=== Guam ===
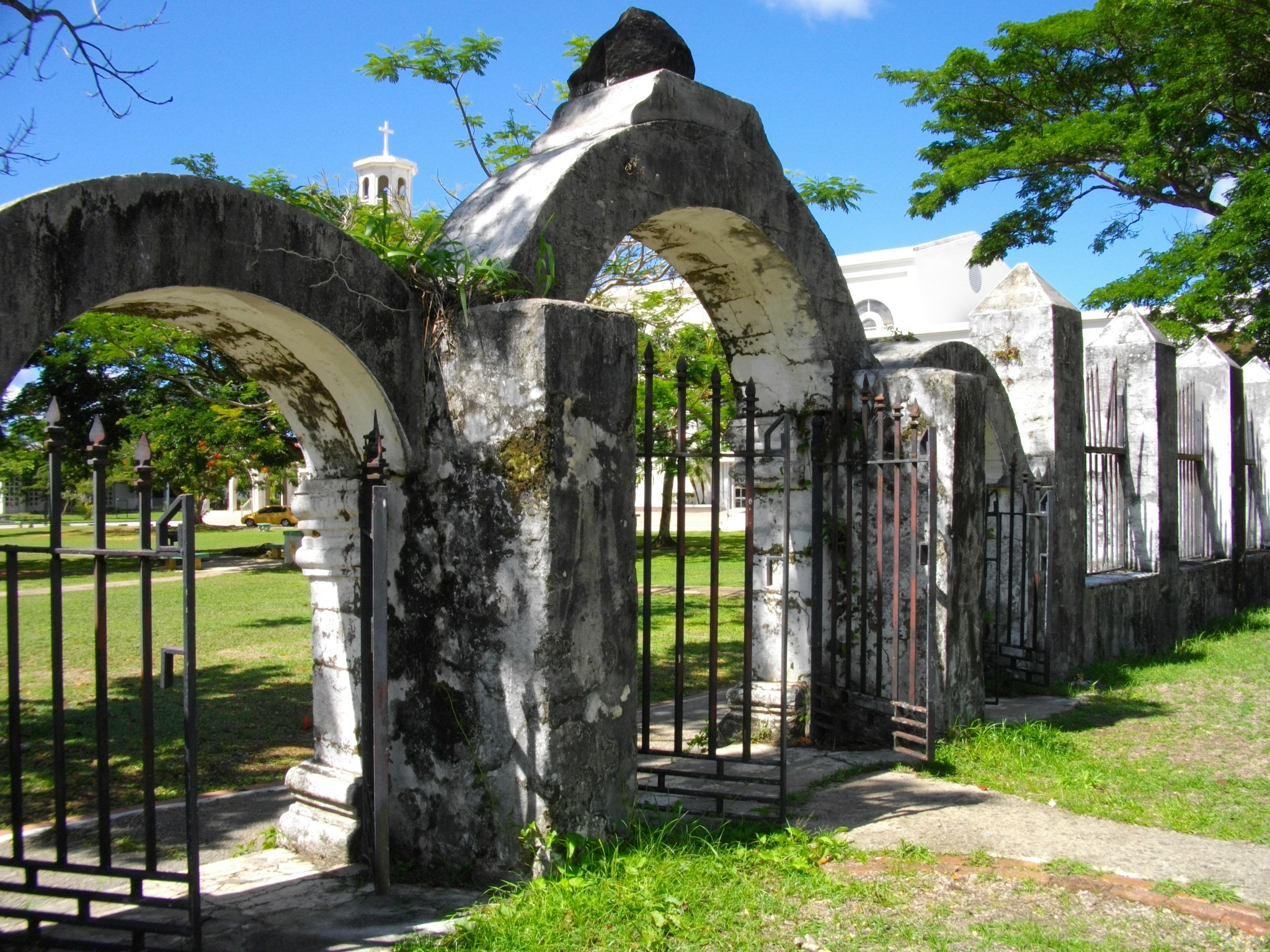
Plaza de España, Almacen Entrance

- Plaza de España – the site of the palace of the Spanish Governors of Guam. The palace itself was largely destroyed during the liberation of Guam however many outlying structures still stand and there are plans to possibly reconstruct the palace in the future.

=== Hawaiʻi ===
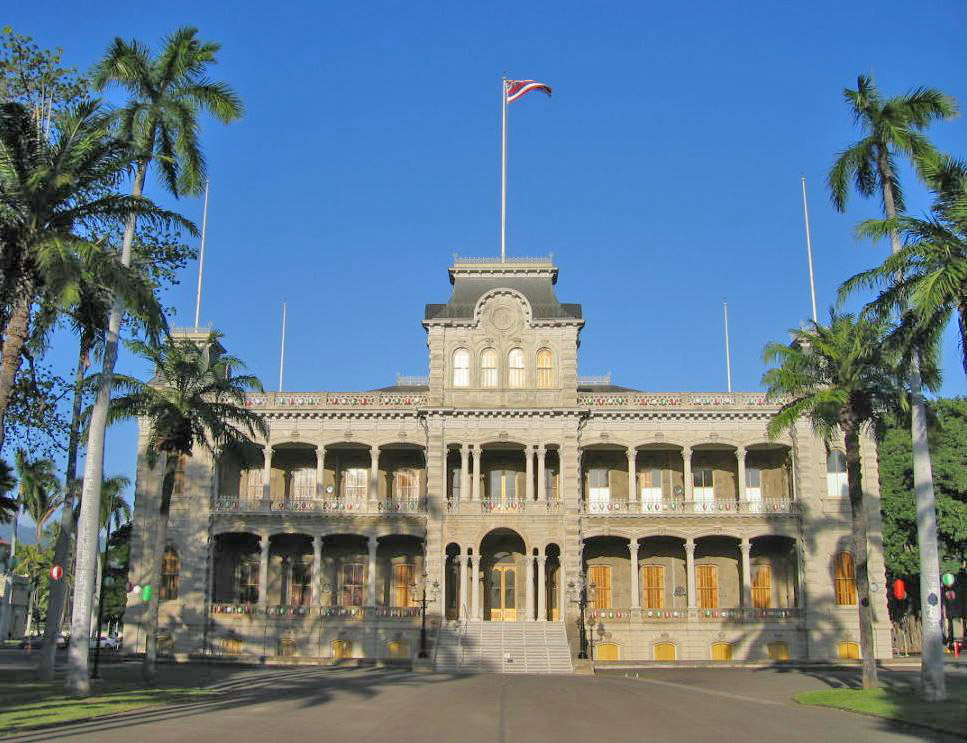
ʻIolani Palace, Honolulu

- ʻĀinahau – royal estate of Princess Victoria Kaʻiulani
- Brick Palace – first Western style building in Hawaiʻi, commissioned by Kamehameha I for his wife Queen Kaʻahumanu in Lāhainā, and the islands first brick structure
- Haleʻākala – royal estate of High Chief Pākī, the former grass hut complex on the same site was known as ʻAikupika
- Hamohamo – royal residence of Queen Liliʻuokalani at Waikīkī
- Hanaiakamalama – royal residence of Queen Emma
- Halekamani – royal residence of Princess Nāhiʻenaʻena in Lahaina, later sold to Gorham D. Gilman
- Haliʻimaile – royal residence of Princess Victoria Kamāmalu and her brother Prince Lot Kapuāiwa until he succeeded as Kamehameha V, in Honolulu, on the corner of King and Richards streets
- Helumoa – royal residence of Kamehameha V at Waikīkī amongst the coconut groves
- Huliheʻe Palace – royal residence of Princess Ruth and later King Kalākaua
- ʻIolani Palace – royal palace, 1882–1893, Honolulu; only official palace in the United States other than the White House
- Kaniakapūpū – royal residence of Kamehameha III and Queen Kalama
- Keōua Hale – royal residence of Princess Ruth
- Kīnaʻu Hale – wooden bungalow of Queen Emma's uncle (either James Kanehoa or Keoni Ana); located near ʻIolani Palace, it served as the chamberlain's residence in Kamehameha V's reign and was the place where Kalākaua was inaugurated as King of Hawaiʻi.
- Marine Residence – royal residence of Lunalilo at Waikīkī, where he died, willed to Queen Emma.
- Mauna Kilohana – royal estate of Queen Emma in Lāwaʻi, Kauaʻi inherited from her uncle Keoni Ana.
- Muolaulani – royal residence of Queen Lili'uokalani at Kapâlama, now the site of Lili`uokalani Children's Center
- Paoakalani – royal residence of Queen Lili'uokalani at Waikīkī, willed to her by her grandfather ʻAikanaka
- Pualeilani – royal residence of King Kalākaua, Queen Kapiʻolani and finally Prince Kūhiō, who willed it to the City of Honolulu; the property Uluniu was purchased by the king from Princess Keʻelikōlani in 1880 for $400
- Keʻalohilani – royal residence of Queen Liliʻuokalani at Waikīkī, willed to her by her grandfather ʻAikanaka; she composed most of her works in this house
- Rooke House – Private residences of Queen Emma; her childhood home
- Ululani – royal residence of Victoria Kinoiki Kekaulike on Beretania Street, became the site of the Kapiʻolani Medical Center for Women and Children
- Waipiʻo Palace – royal grasshut palace of the ancient chiefs of Hawaiʻi, most significant for the four nioi tree columns which supported it, according to oral traditions; later destroyed by the King Kahekili II of Maui
- Wānanakoa – Private residence of Bernice Pauahi Bishop and Charles Reed Bishop at the beginning of their marriage; it was a small cottage located in the Nuʻuanu Valley where the Royal Mausoleum of Hawaiʻi stands now
- Washington Place – royal residence of Queen Liliʻuokalani

=== New Jersey ===
- Proprietary House – Home of both the Proprietary Governors of New Jersey from 1766 to 1773 and the Royal Governor of New Jersey, William Franklin from 1774 to 1776.

=== New Mexico ===
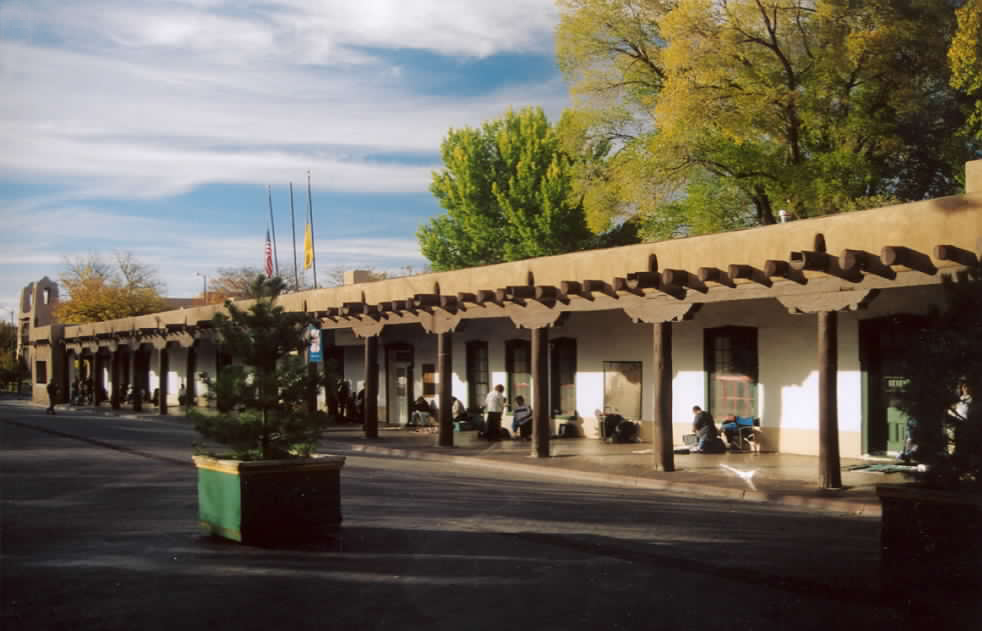
Palace of the Governors, Santa Fe

- Palace of the Governors – Oldest continuously occupied public building in the United States. Originally built as a home for the governors of Santa Fe de Nuevo México, a province of the Viceroyalty of New Spain and later, a territory of Mexico.

=== North Carolina ===
- Tryon Palace – Royal seat of British colonial rule in the Province of North Carolina.
- Biltmore Estate – Home of George Washington Vanderbilt II and largest house in the United States.

=== Pennsylvania ===
- Pennsbury Manor – Home of William Penn as Proprietor of Pennsylvania from 1683 to 1701.

=== Puerto Rico ===
- Palacio de Santa Catalina – Also known as La Fortaleza

=== Texas ===
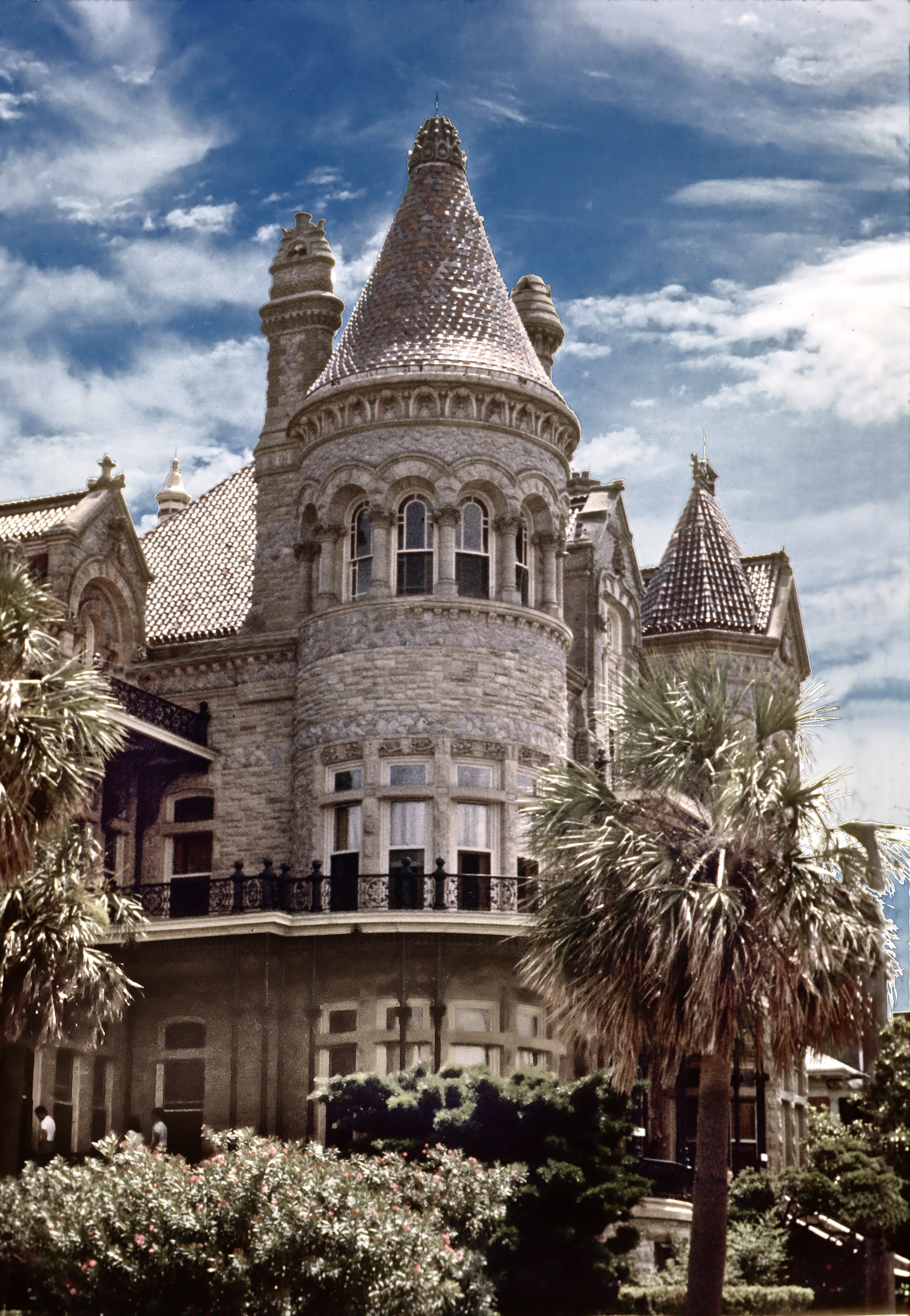
Bishop's Palace, Galveston circa 1970

- Bishop's Palace, Galveston – former residence of the Bishops of the Roman Catholic Archdiocese of Galveston-Houston. Recognized as one of the top fourteen finest examples of Victorian architecture in the United States.

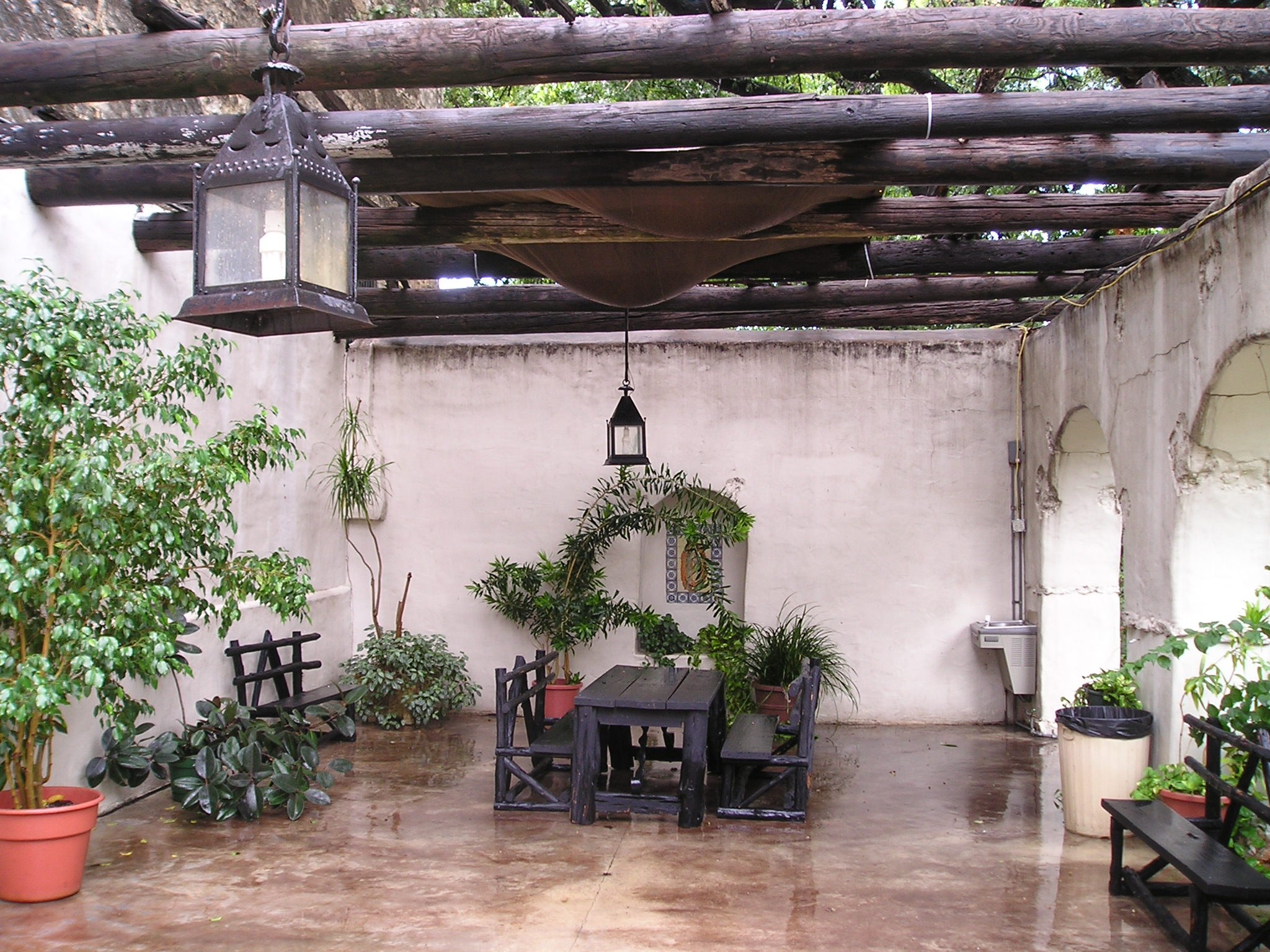
Inside of Spanish Governor's Palace in San Antonio, Texas

- Spanish Governor's Palace – official residence of the governors of Tejas, a territory of the Viceroyalty of New Spain. Located in San Antonio, it is considered the sole remaining example of an aristocratic early Spanish house in Texas.

=== Virginia ===
- Governor's Palace – Royal seat of British colonial rule in the Colony of Virginia.

== Uzbekistan ==
- Ak-Saray Palace
- Ark of Bukhara
- Konya Ark
- Nurullabai Palace
- Romanov Palace
- Shirbudun Palace
- Sitorai Mokhi-Khosa
- Toshhovli Palace

== Vatican City ==
- Apostolic Palace – residence of the Pope
- Lateran Palace – seat of the Pope

== Venezuela ==
- Palacio de Miraflores – seat of the president of Venezuela, Caracas

== Vietnam ==
- Imperial Palace (The Forbidden Purple City) – former Seat of the Emperors of Vietnam, Huế
- Presidential Palace in Hanoi
- Reunification Palace
- Cổ Loa Citadel
- Gia Long Palace
- Thang Long Imperial City
- Tây Đô castle

== Yemen ==
- Dar al-Hajar
- Dar al-Bashair
- Dar al-Shukr
- Dar as-Sa'd
- Ghumdan Palace
- Palace of Queen Arwa
- Saba' Palace
- Seiyun Palace

== List of non-residential palaces ==
Some large impressive buildings which were not meant to be residences, but are nonetheless called palaces, include:

- Alexandra Palace (England)
- Legislative Palace of San Lazaro, Mexico City – official Seat of the bicameral Honorable Mexican Congress of the Union (Senate and Chamber of Deputies), but ordinary seat of the Chamber of Deputies
- Palace of the Legislative Assembly of the Federal District, Mexico City – seat of the Legislative Assembly of the Federal District
- Palace of the Parliament, Bucharest: 2nd largest building in world (by floorspace)
- Palacio de Bellas Artes, Mexico City – National house of the arts and culture in Mexico, former legislative palace.
- Palacio de Correos de Mexico, Mexico City – Serves as the mail centre of Mexico City and Mexico itself
- Palacio de Comunicaciones de Madrid (Spain)
- Palast der Republik (Germany)
- Palau de la Música Catalana (Spain)
- Peace Palace (The Netherlands)
- The Crystal Palace (England)
- Galeria degli Uffizi (Italy)
- Victoria Palace – seat of the Prime Minister, Bucharest
- Palace of Justice in Antwerp (former)
- Palace of Justice in Antwerp (recent)
- Palace of Justice in Brussels
- Palace of facets (Russia)
- Priory Palace (Russia)
- Soviet-era Palaces of Culture (Russia)
- The People's Palace (Scotland)
- Palace of Justice, (Malaysia)

Note, too, the French use of the word palais in such constructions as palais des congrès (convention centre) and palais de justice (courthouse).

== See also ==
- List of royal palaces
- World's largest palace
- List of castles
- List of forts
- List of mausoleums
- Official residence
