= National Museum (Maldives) =

Museum in Malé, Maldives

- Established: 11 November 1952
- Location: Machchangolhi, Malé, Maldives
- Coordinates: 4.177283°N 73.509979°E

The National Museum of the Maldives is a museum that contains unique collections of historical artefacts. The museum was opened on 11 November 1952 by Prime Minister Mohamed Amin Didi.

== Overview ==
With the purpose of preserving history and instilling patriotism among the people of the Maldives, the museum has a large collection of historical artifacts, ranging from stone objects to fragments of royal antiquities from the Buddhist era to the rule of Islamic monarchs.

The museum was previously administered by the Maldivian Center for Linguistic and Historical Research. However, on 28 April 2010, this institution was abolished by President Mohamed Nasheed and its charge of the museum's responsibilities given to the Ministry of Tourism, Arts and Culture while the linguistic and historical research responsibilities were handed over to the Maldives College of Higher Education.

== Building ==
The three-story museum (old building) is located in the Sultan Park in Malé, which is part of the site of the Maldivian Royal Palace compound dating back to the 17th century. The two-storey Us-gēkolhu is the only remaining structure of the palace demolished by fire in 1968.

The new building of the museum is also located in Sultan Park. The building was designed, built and financed by the Chinese government. The building was presented to the Maldives by the Chinese government on 10 July 2010, but was officially opened and declared as the national museum two weeks later on Maldives' Independence Day, 26 July 2010.

The interior of the museum has been retained from the days of the Sultanate, including the handwritten Qur'an engraved on the walls of the building.

== Collections ==
A diverse collection of artifacts are displayed in the museum, including relics from the foregone pre-Islamic period era, thrones, royal sunshades and furniture, costumes and shoes, coins, ornaments, arms and armor.

Others examples include textiles such as ceremonial dresses, turbans, fancy slippers and belts used on special occasions, mats, lacquer work and other creative embroidery.

Highlights of the collections include:

- A coral stone head of Buddha, an 11th-century piece from Alifu Thoddoo
- A 13th-century engraved wooden plank from Hukuru Miskiiy
- The Feyli Kolhu worn by the Sultan Ghaazee Mohammed Thakurufaanu-al-A"z"am is a fine example of the intricate craftsmanship of the Maldivian weavers in the 16th century.

== Destruction of pre-Islamic artifacts ==
The Buddhist statues were deliberately destroyed by Islamists in February 2012. Museum director Ali Waheed said that almost all the museum's pre-Islamic artifacts, dating back to before the 12th century, had been destroyed: "Some of the pieces can be put together but mostly they are made of sandstone, coral and limestone, and they are reduced to powder." He said the museum had "nothing [left] to show" of the country's pre-Islamic history.

Among the damaged objects were a six-faced coral statue, an 18 in (46 cm) high bust of Buddha, as well as assorted limestone and coral statues.

Former president Maumoon Abdul Gayoom described this incident as a "tremendous loss" to the country's history, culture, and the country itself.

== Opening times ==
- 10am–4pm, Sunday–Saturday (closed Friday)

== Gallery ==
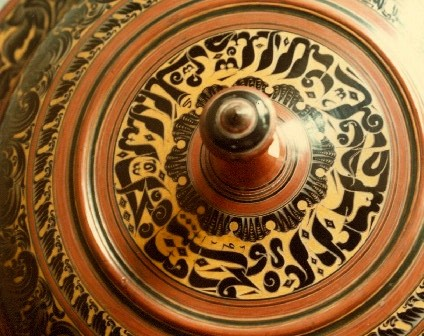
Old Malaafaiy lacquered wooden food cover from Thulhadhoo kept at the National Museum

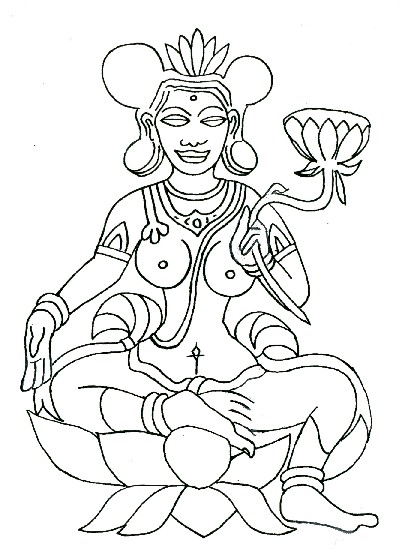
Maldivian Tara, 30 cm high etching on Porites coral stone from the 9th century kept at the National Museum in Malé, Maldives

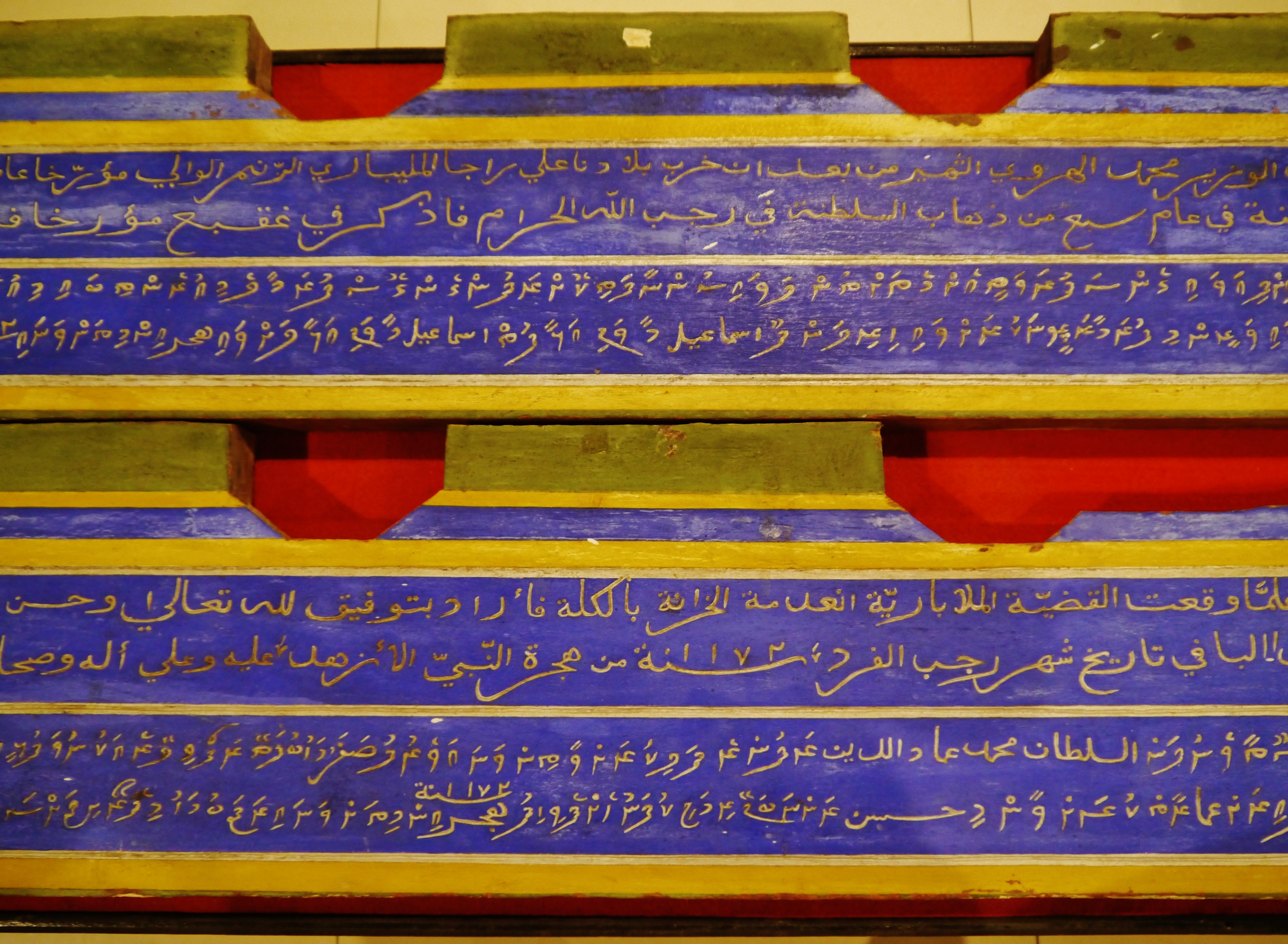

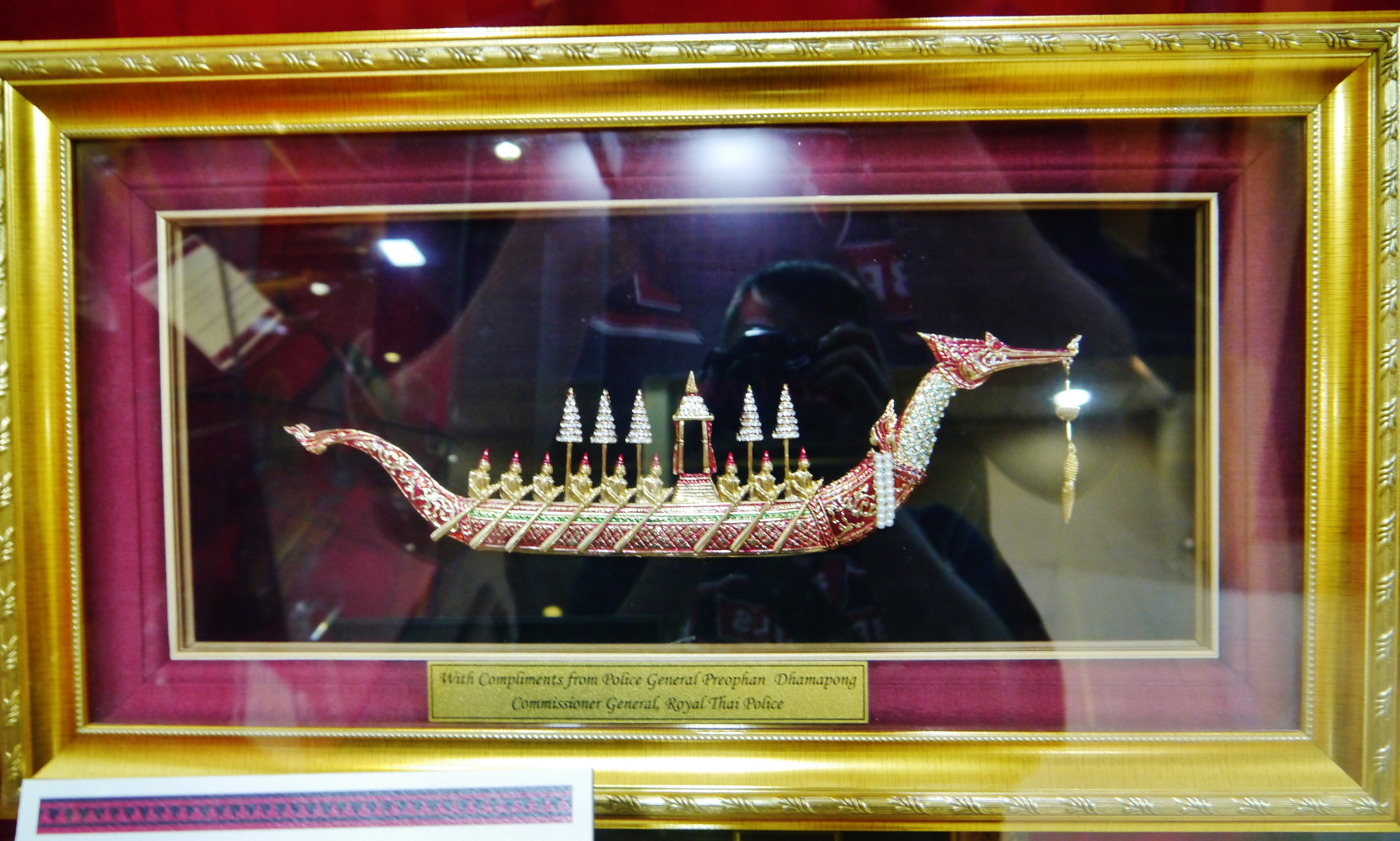
"With Compliments from Police General Preophan Dhamapong Commissioner General, Royal Thai Police"

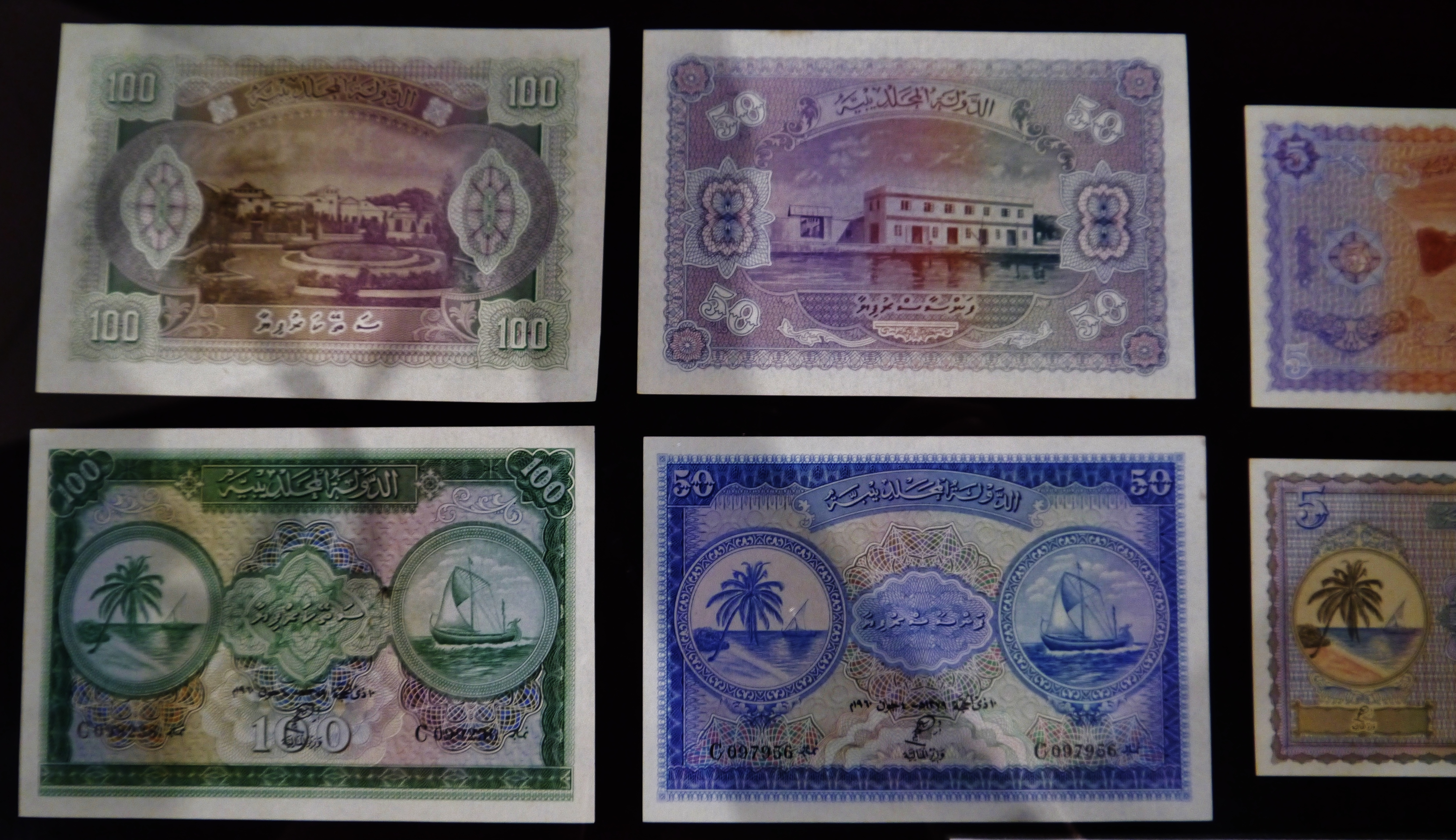
Maldivian money

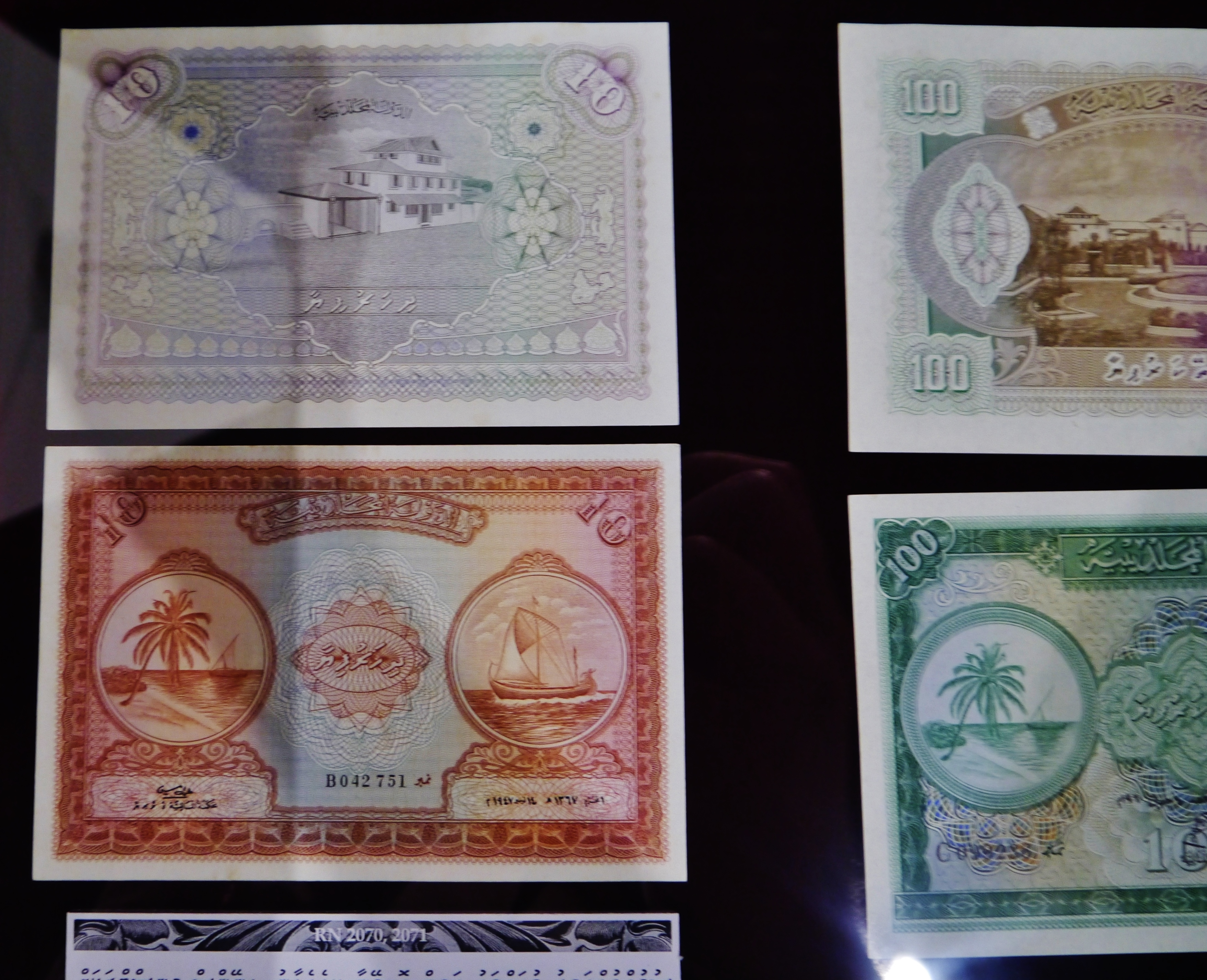
Maldivian money

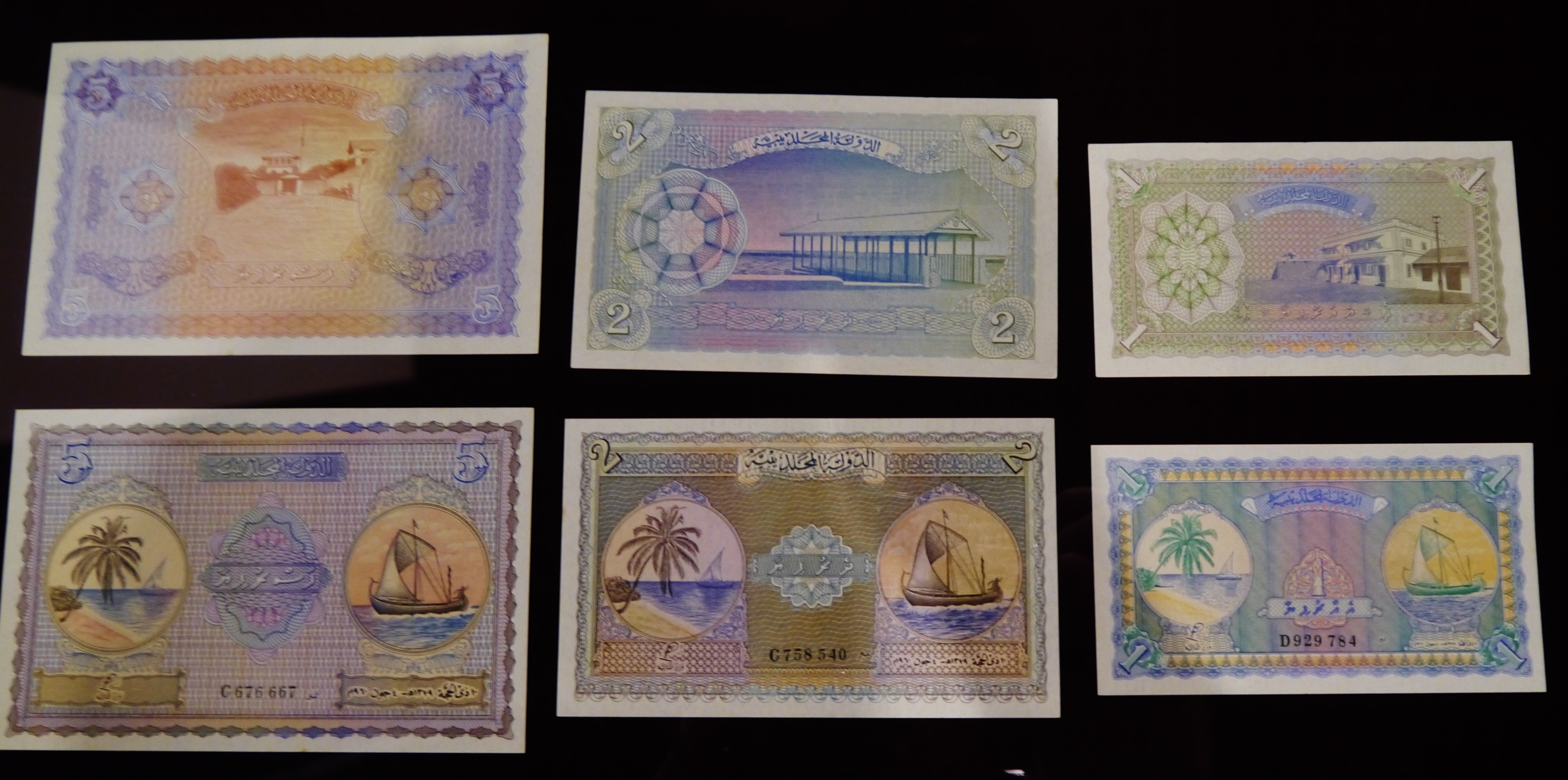
Maldivian money

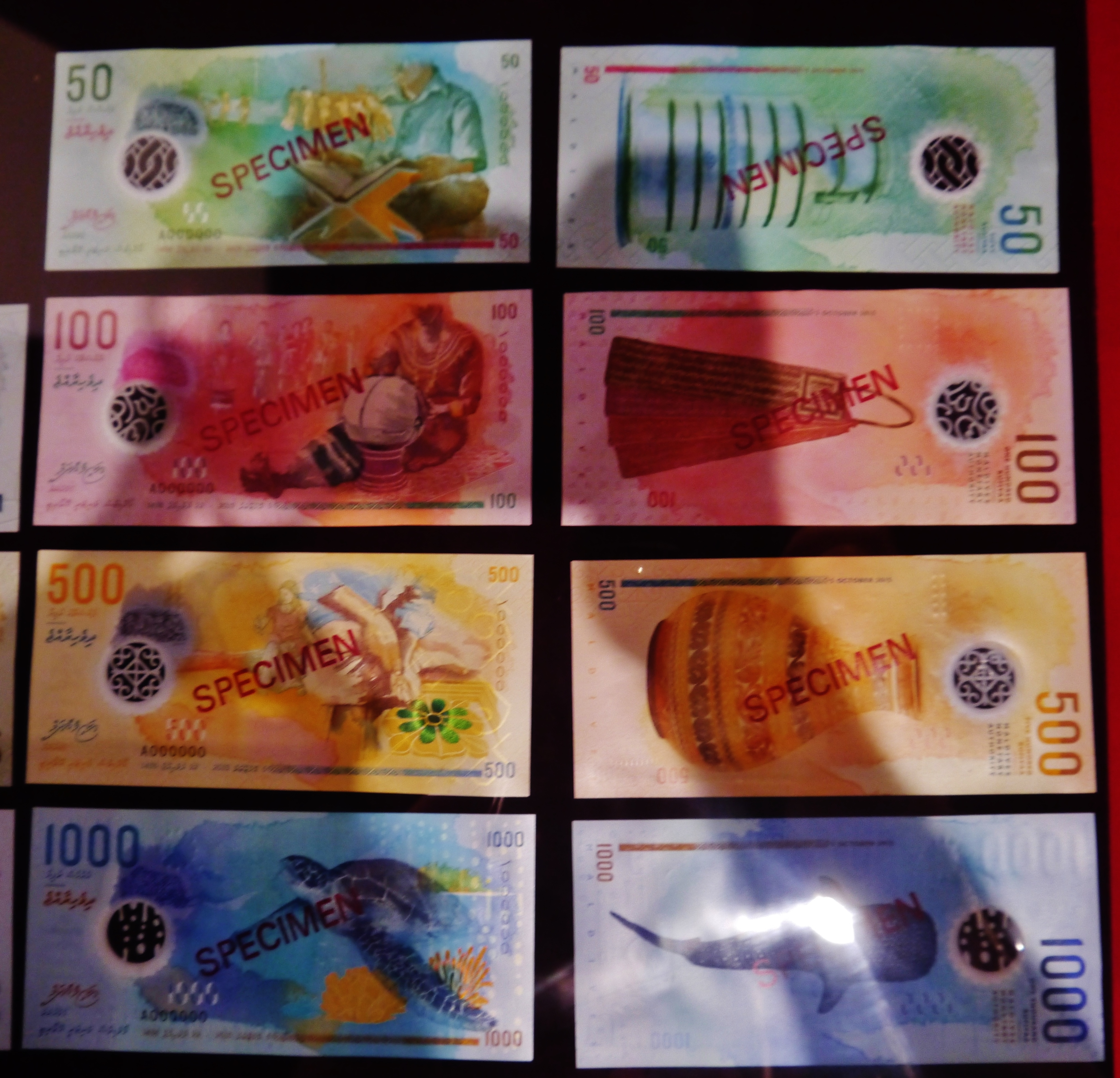
Maldivian money

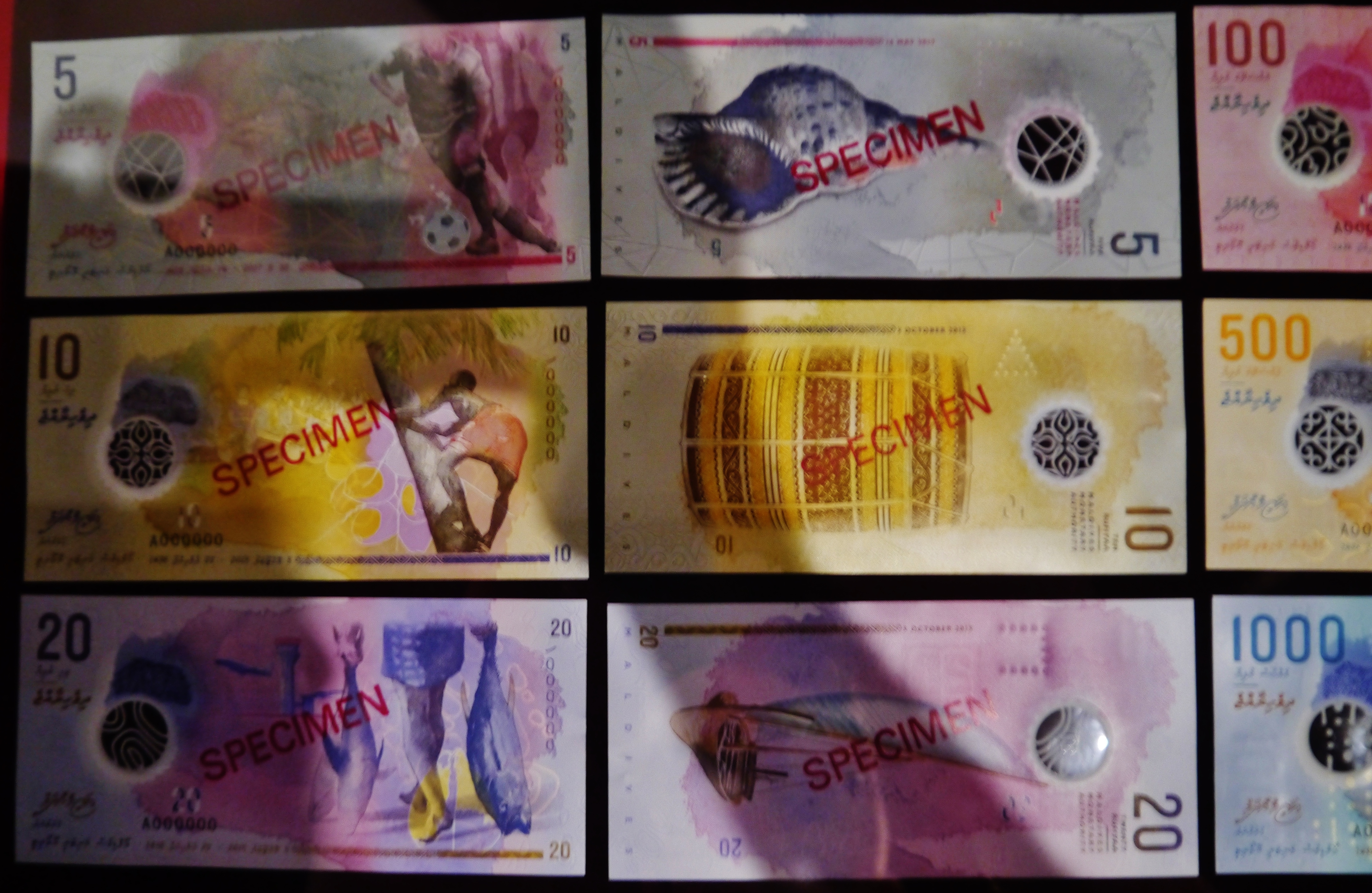
Maldivian money

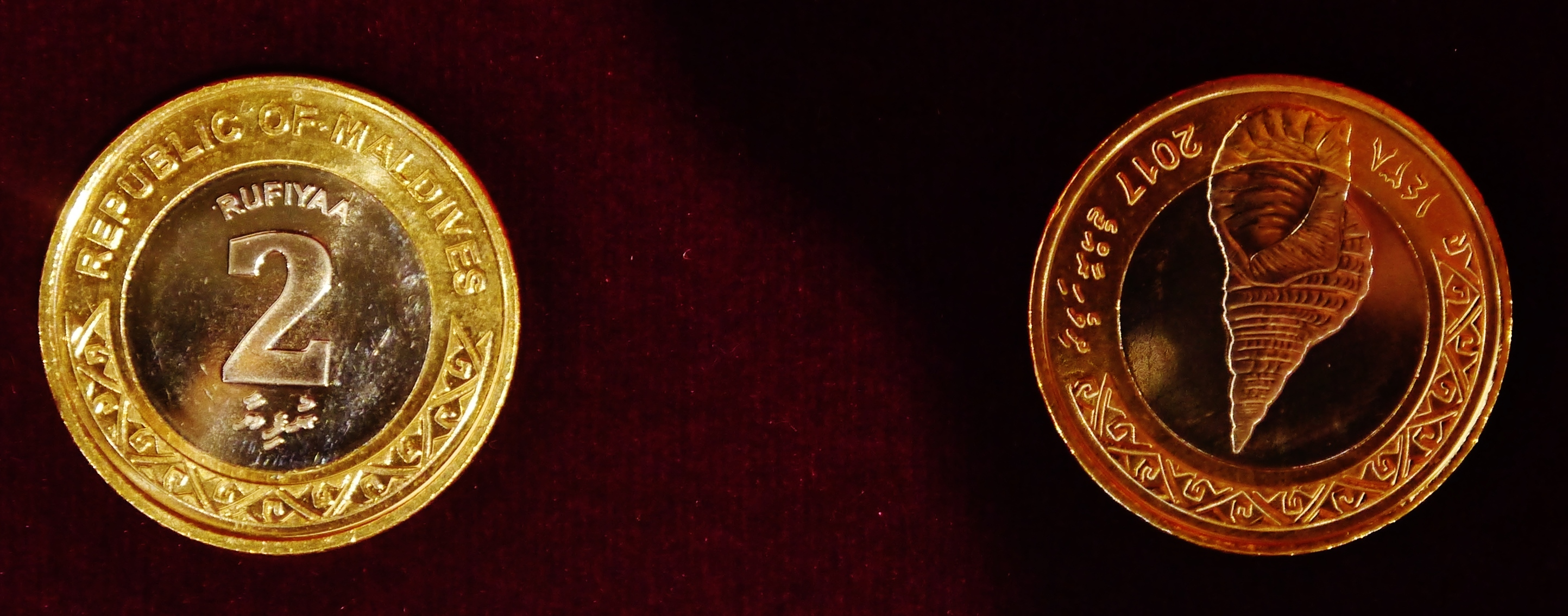
Maldivian coins

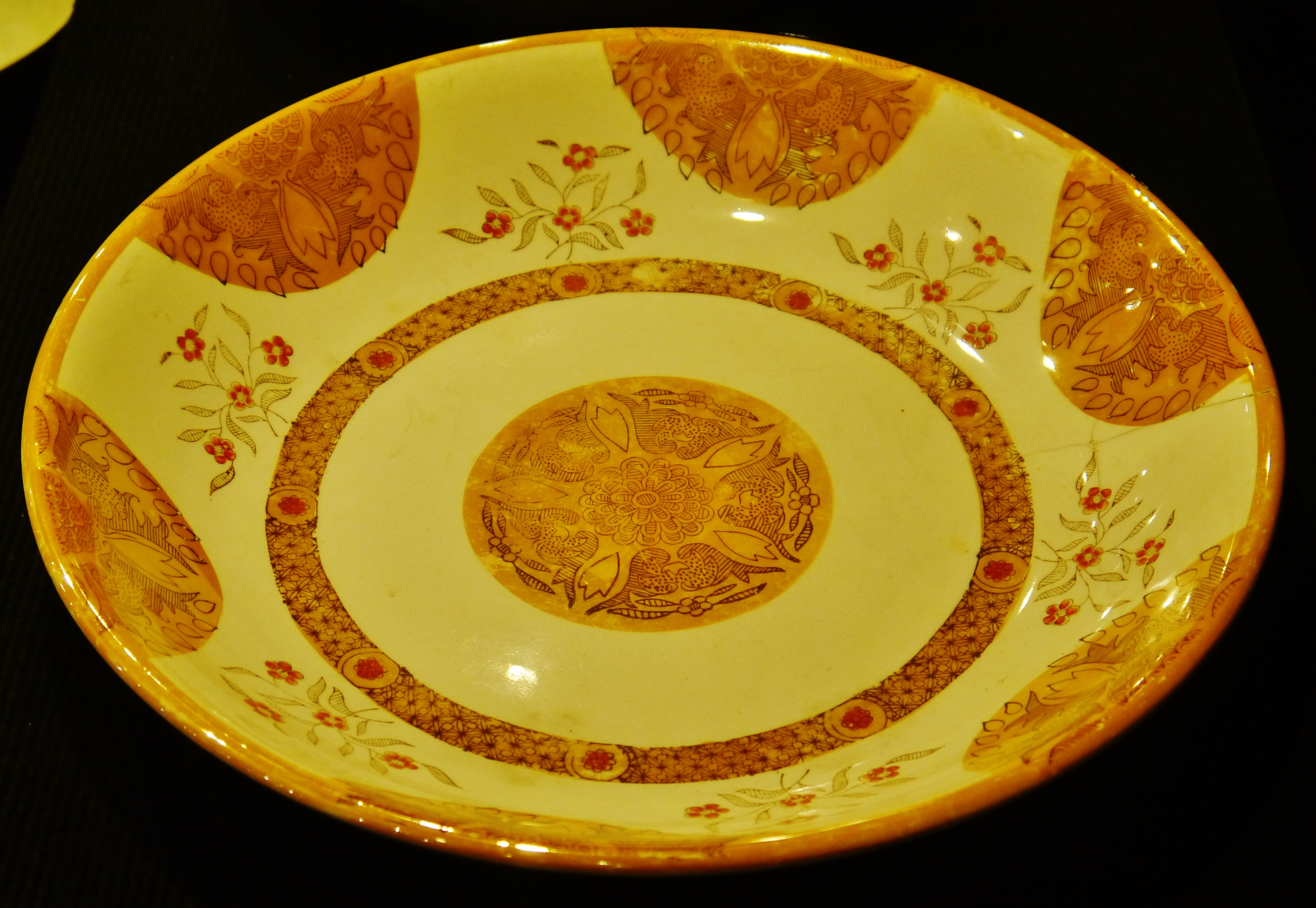
Innen Geschirr plate

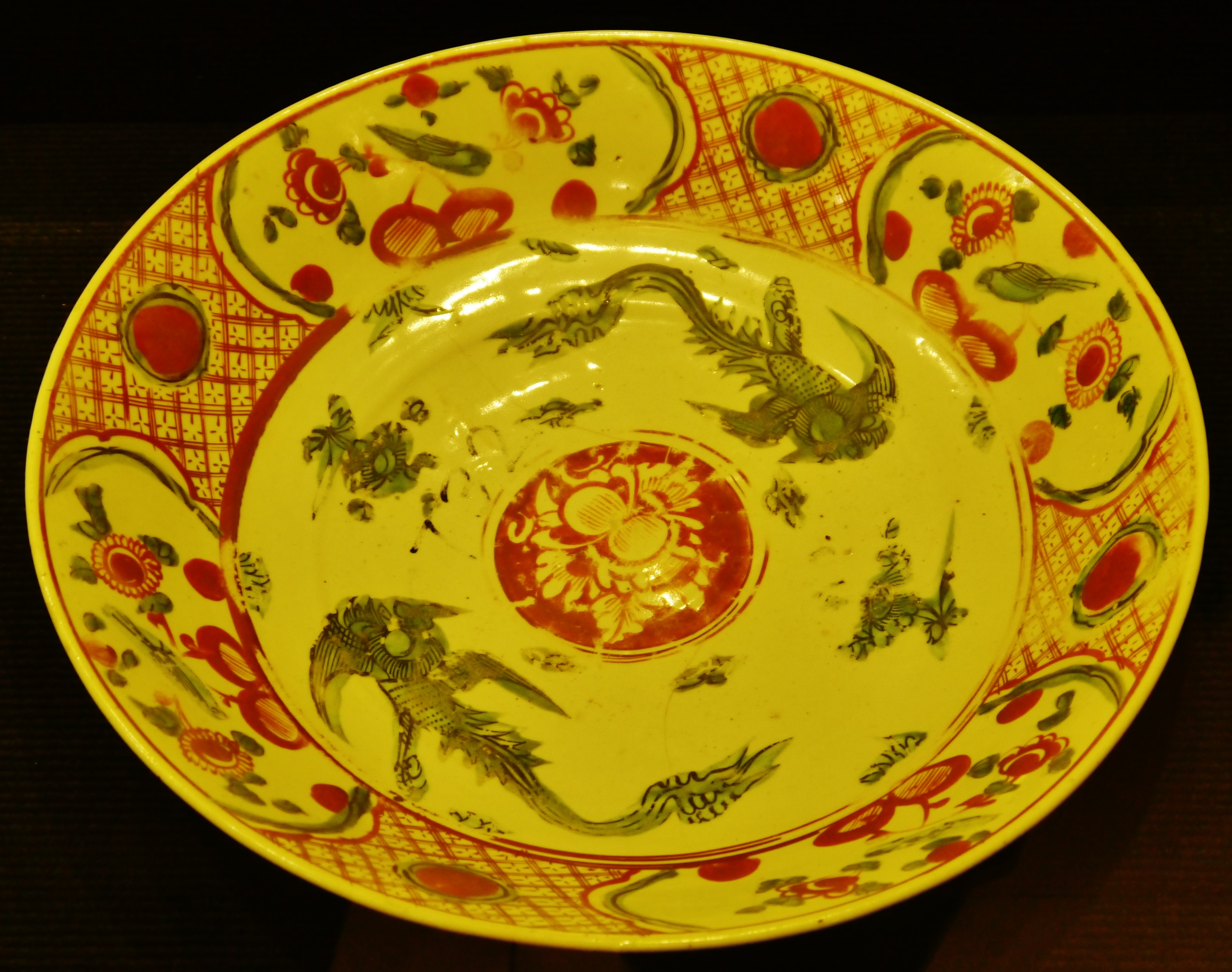
Innen Geschirr plate

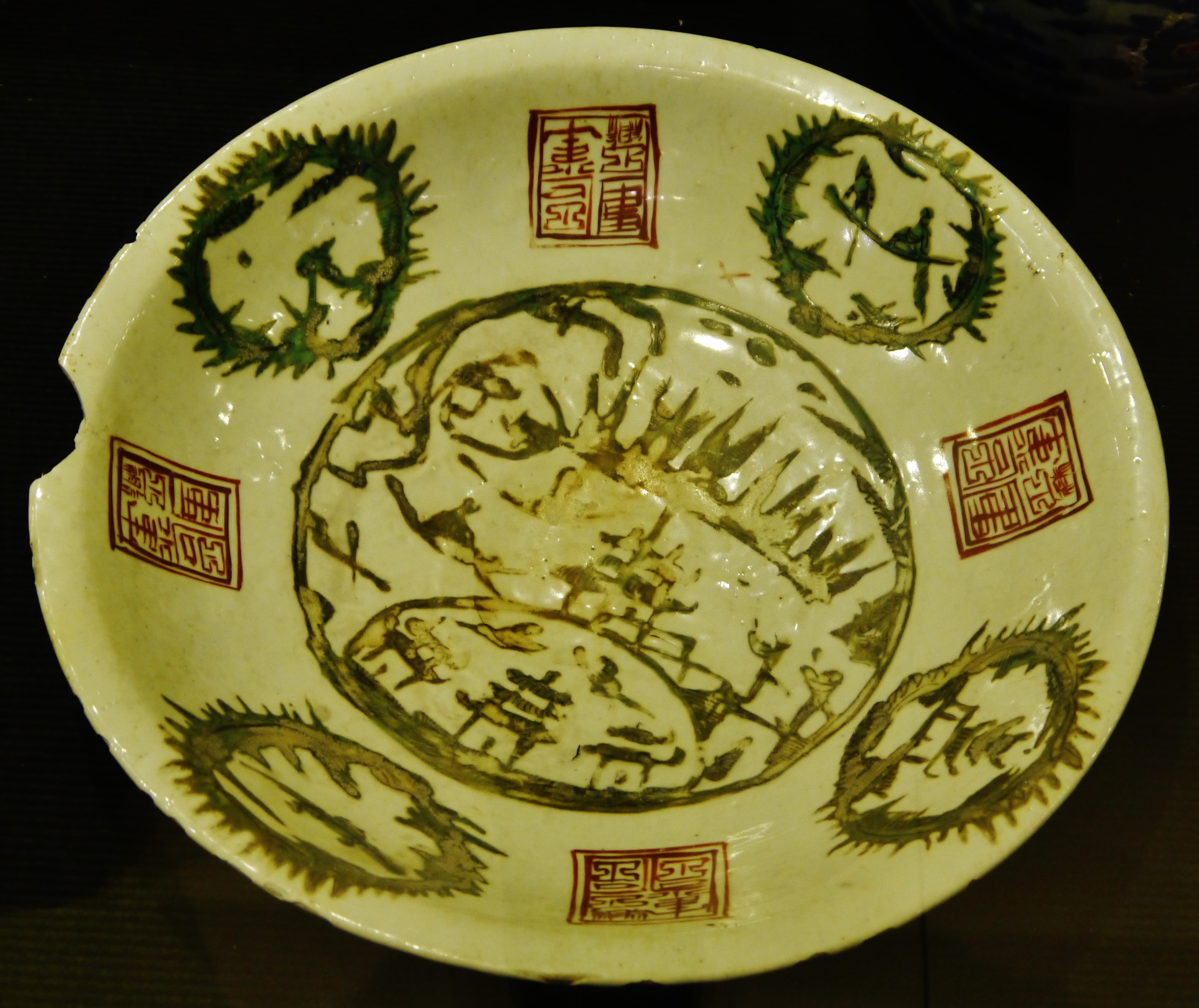
Innen Geschirr plate

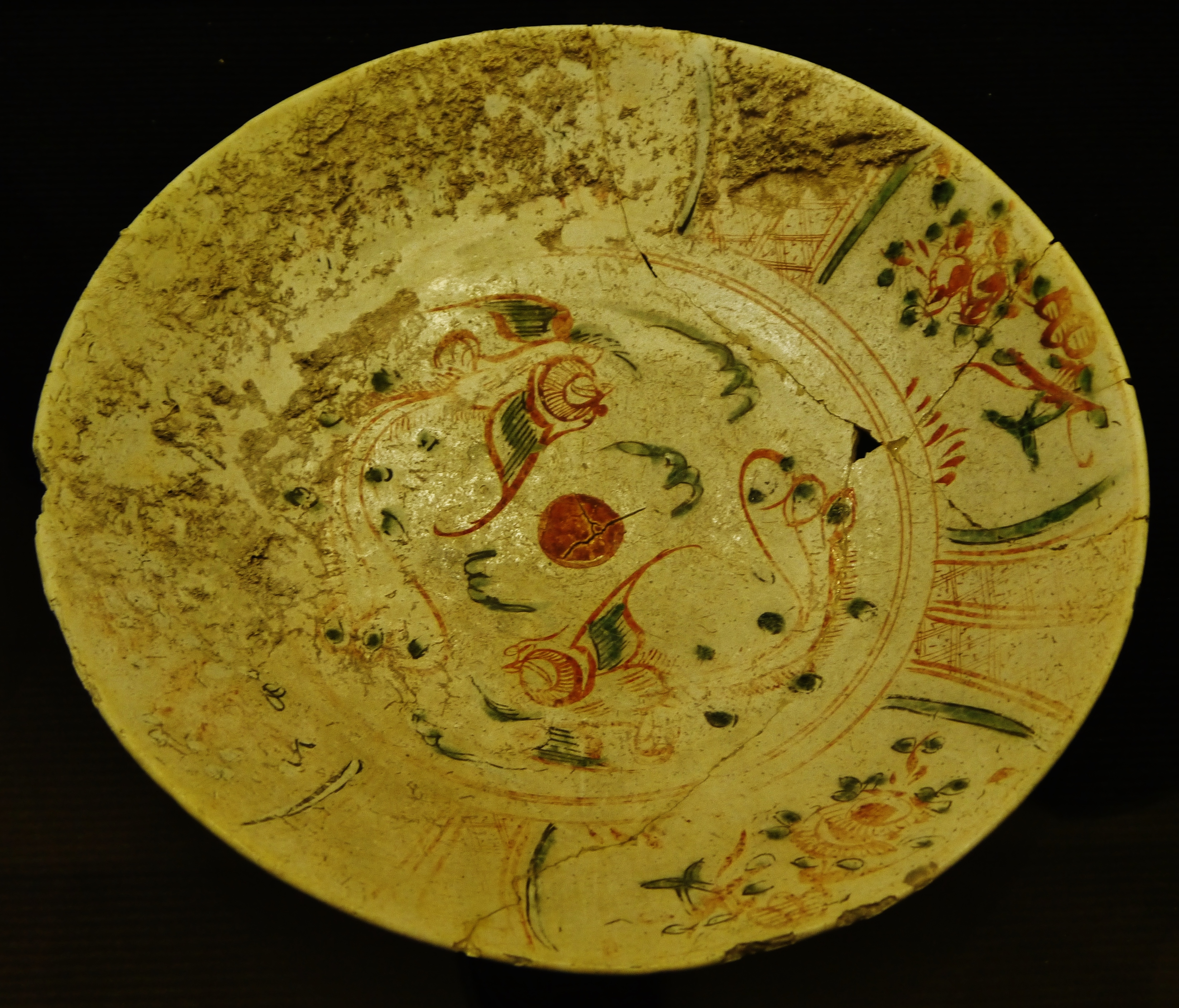
Innen Geschirr plate

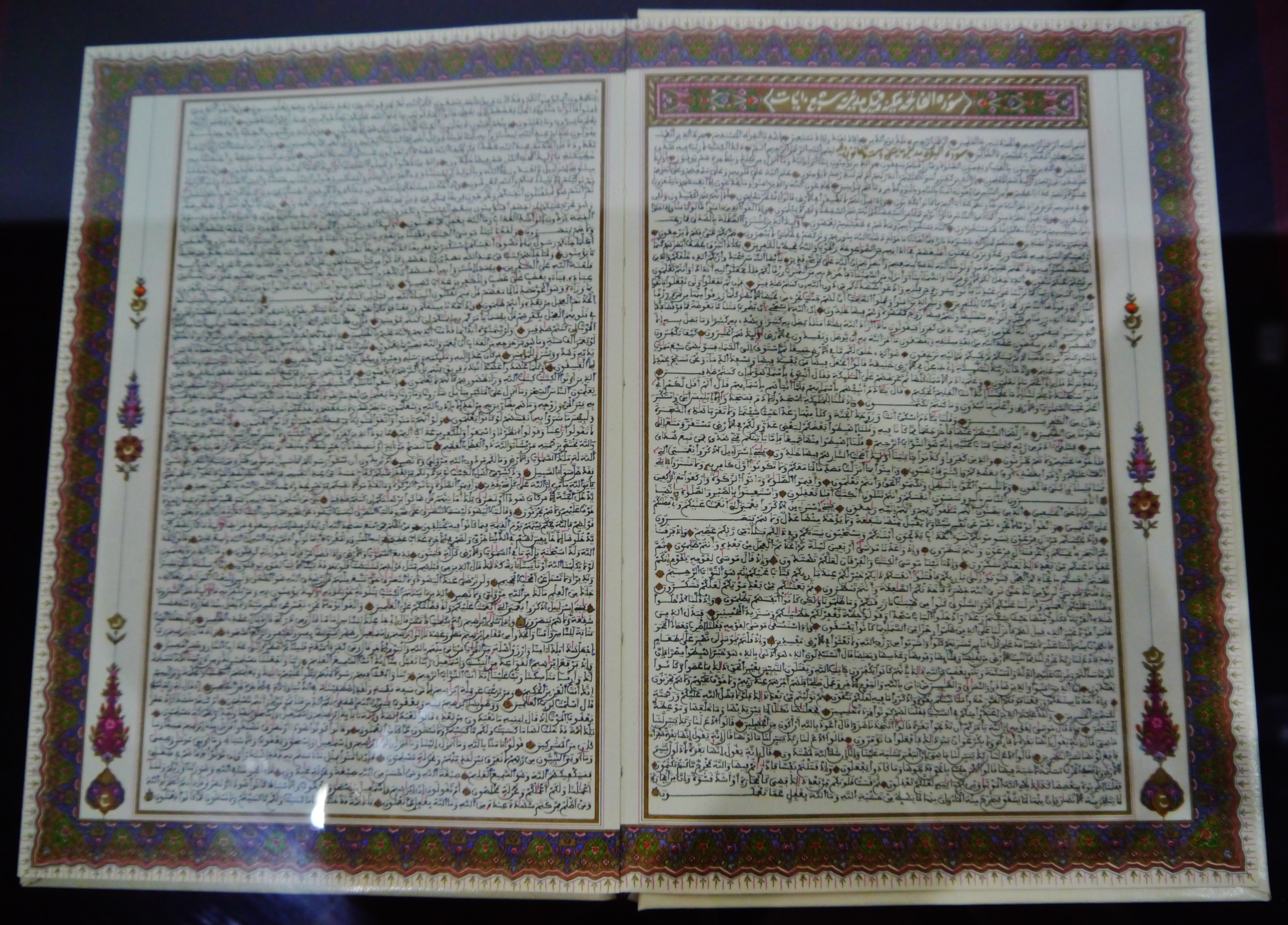
Quran

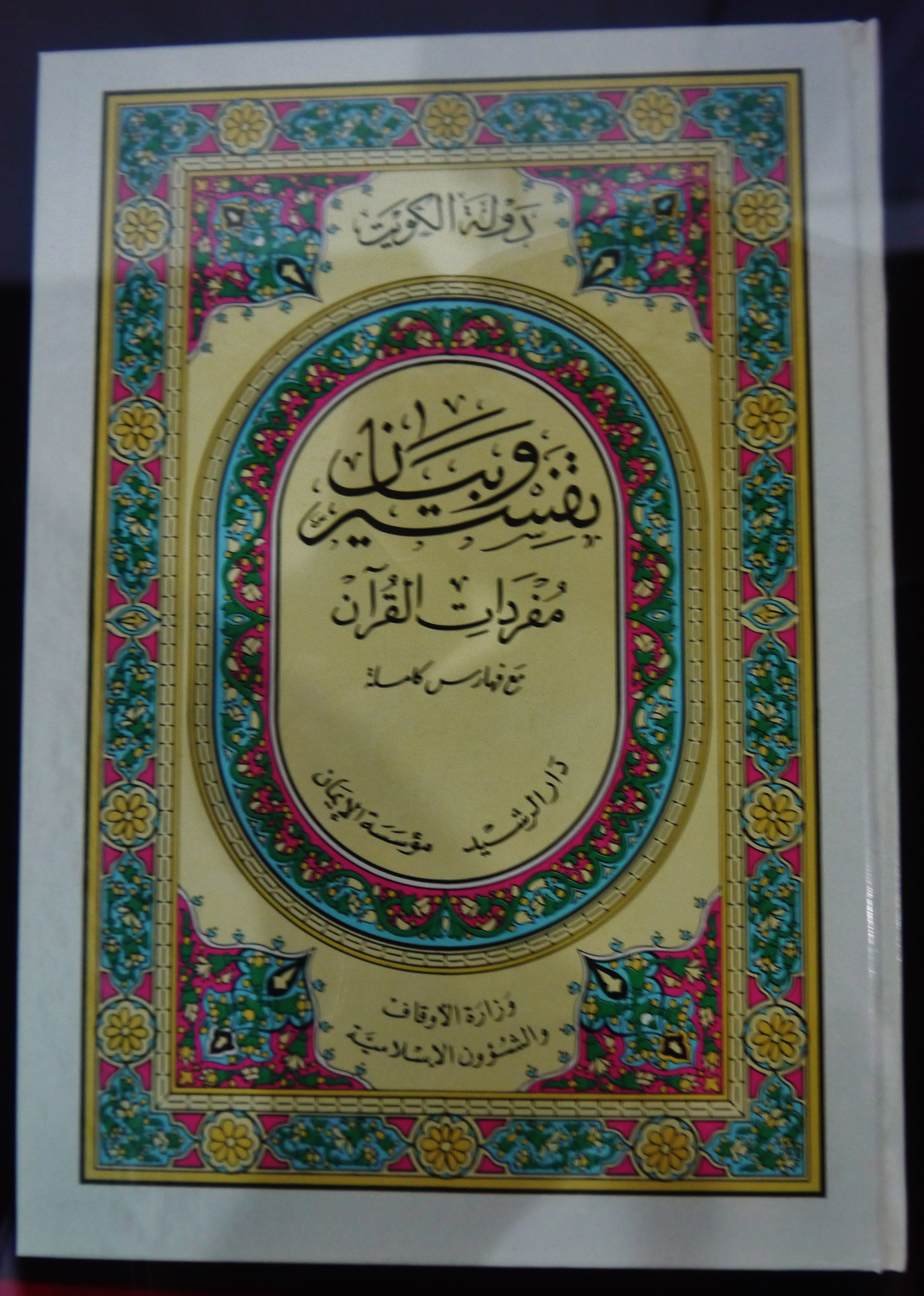
Quran

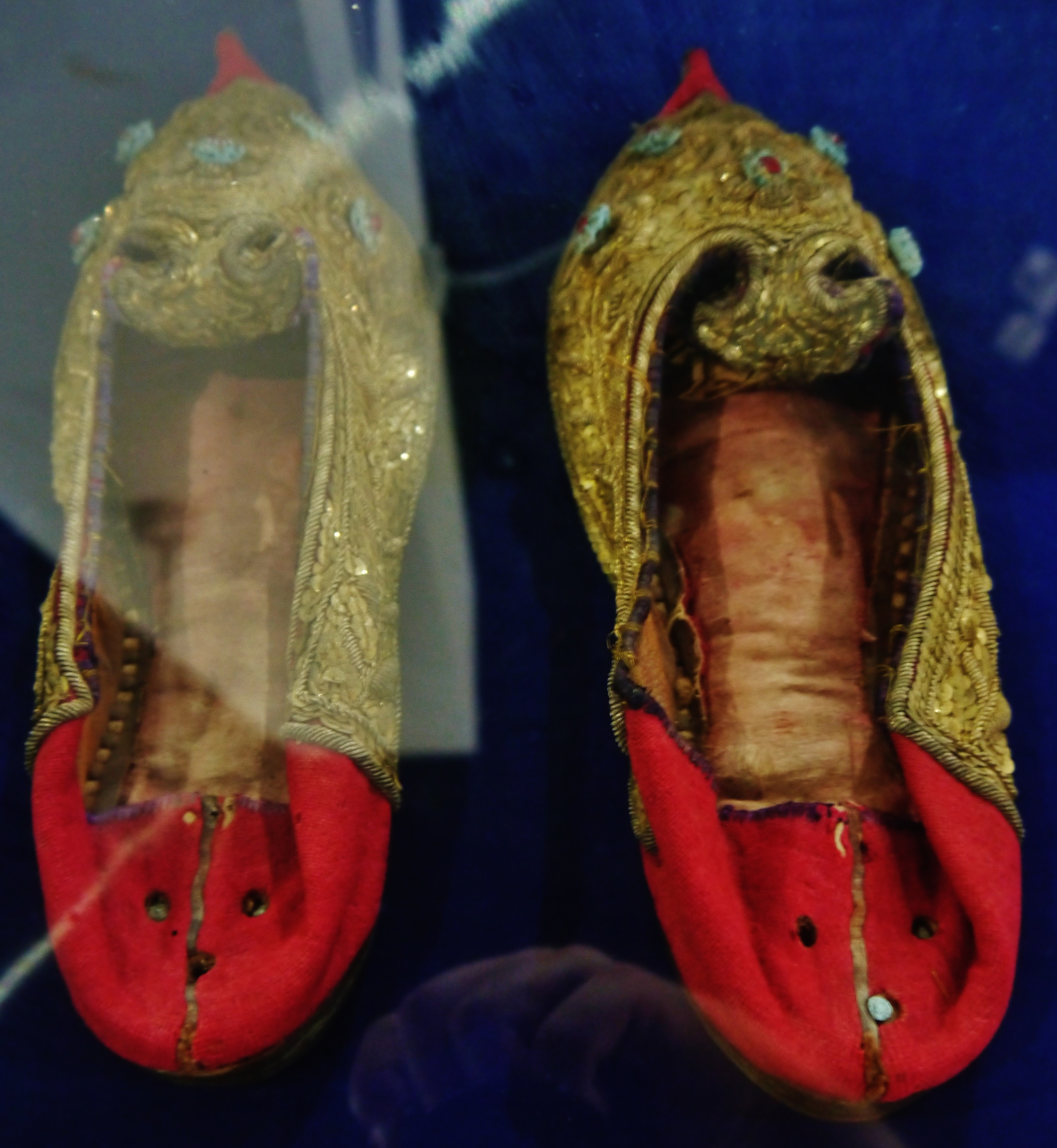
King's Shoes

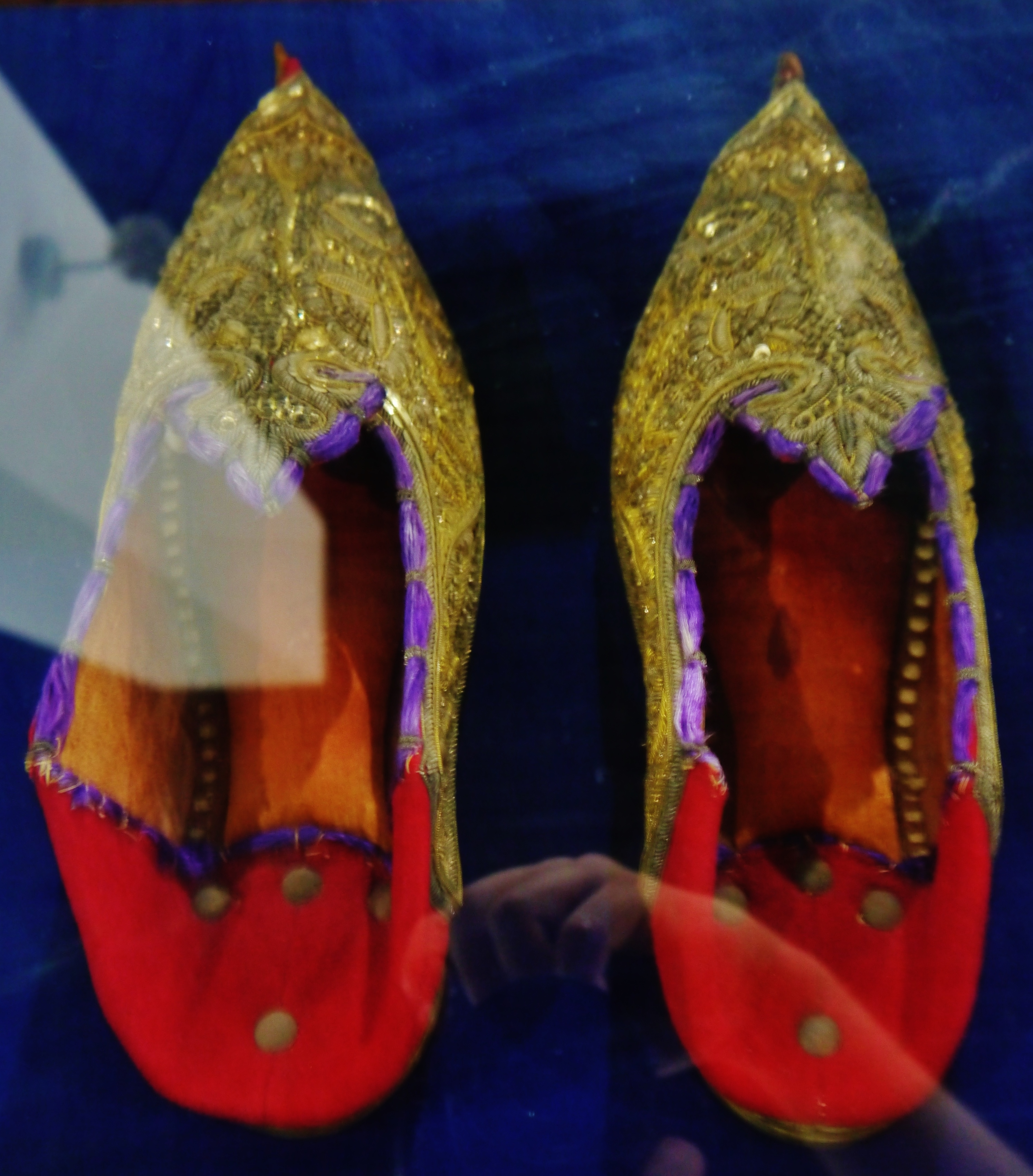
King's Shoes

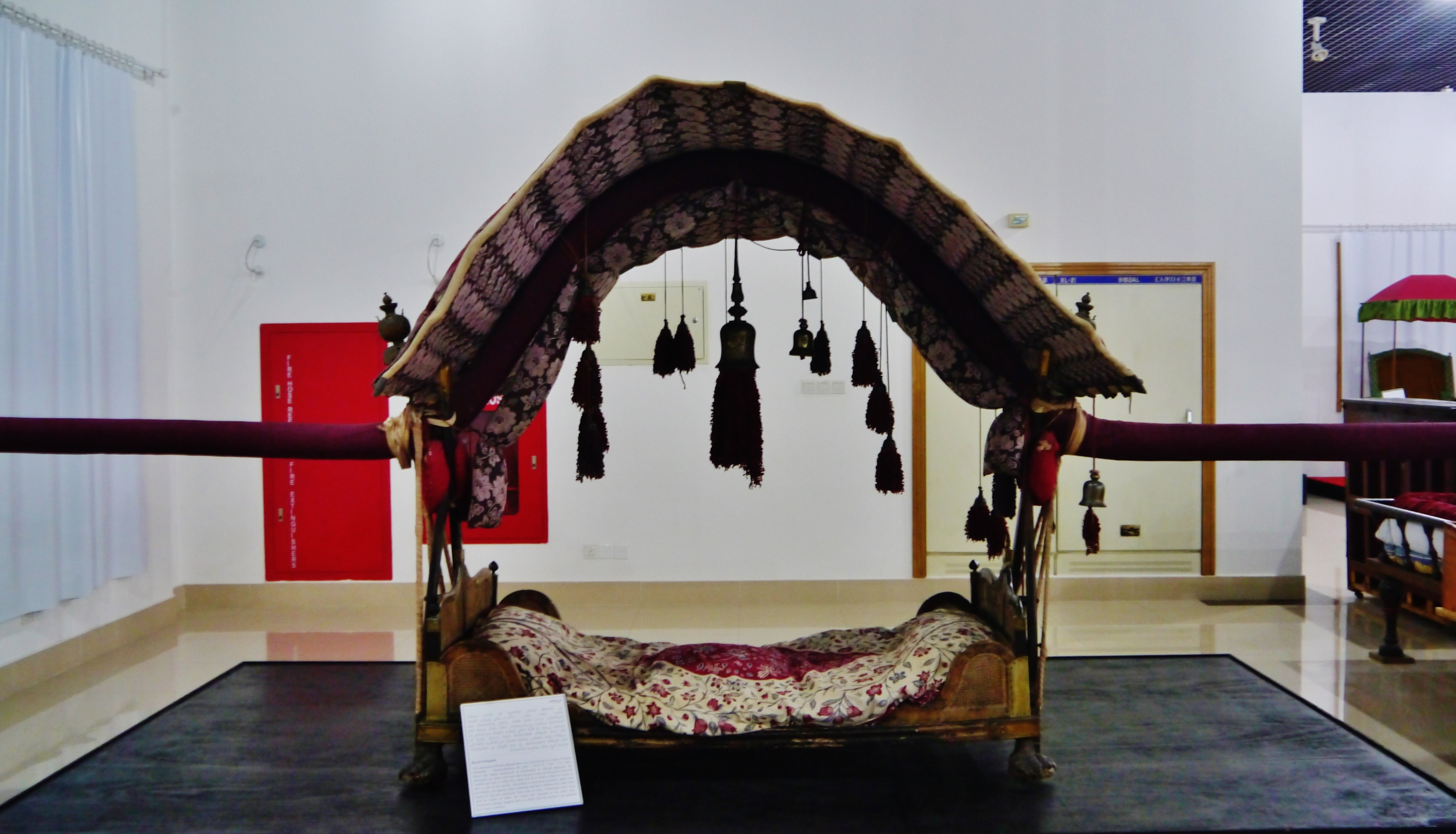
King's Seat

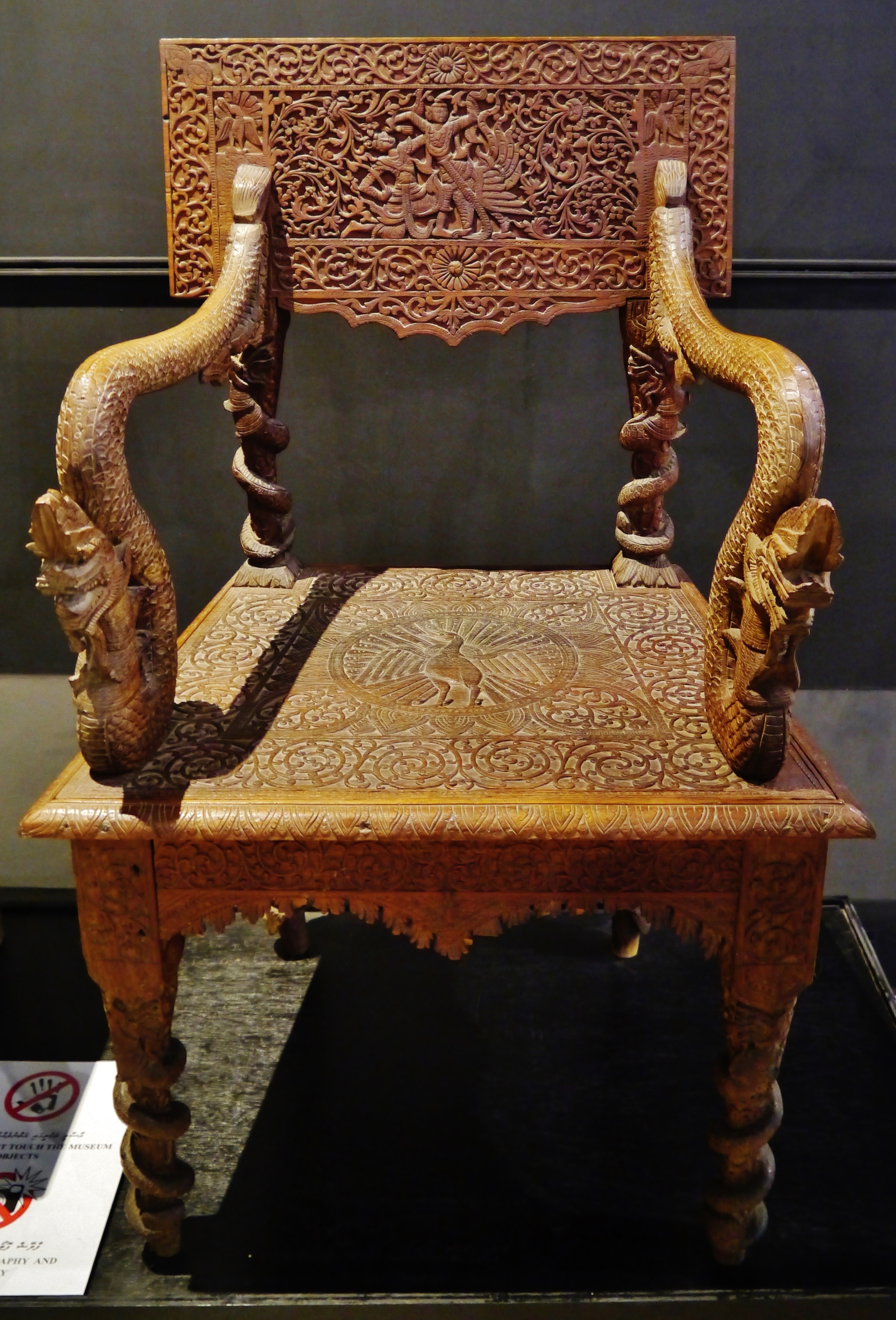
King’s seat

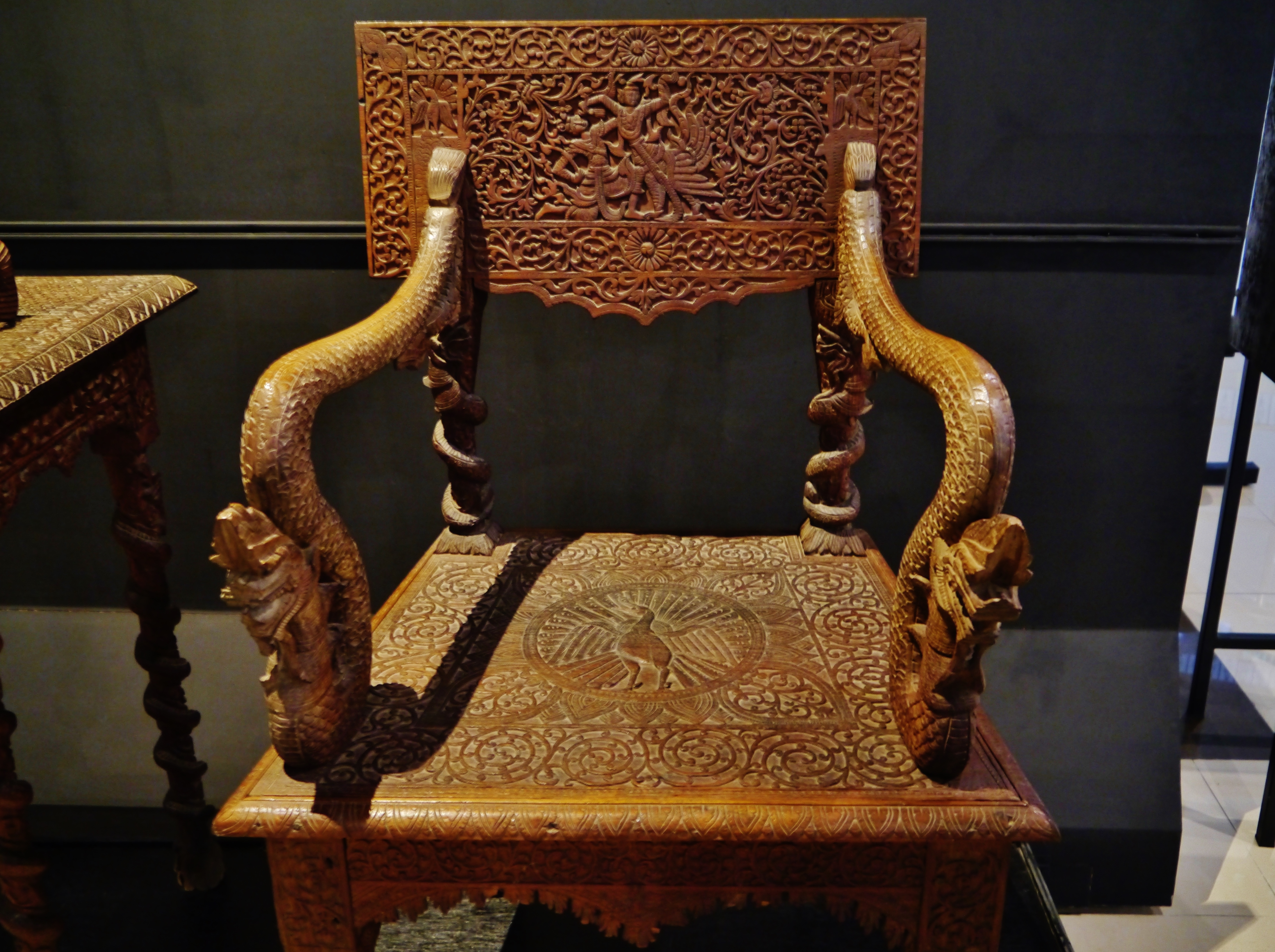
King’s seat

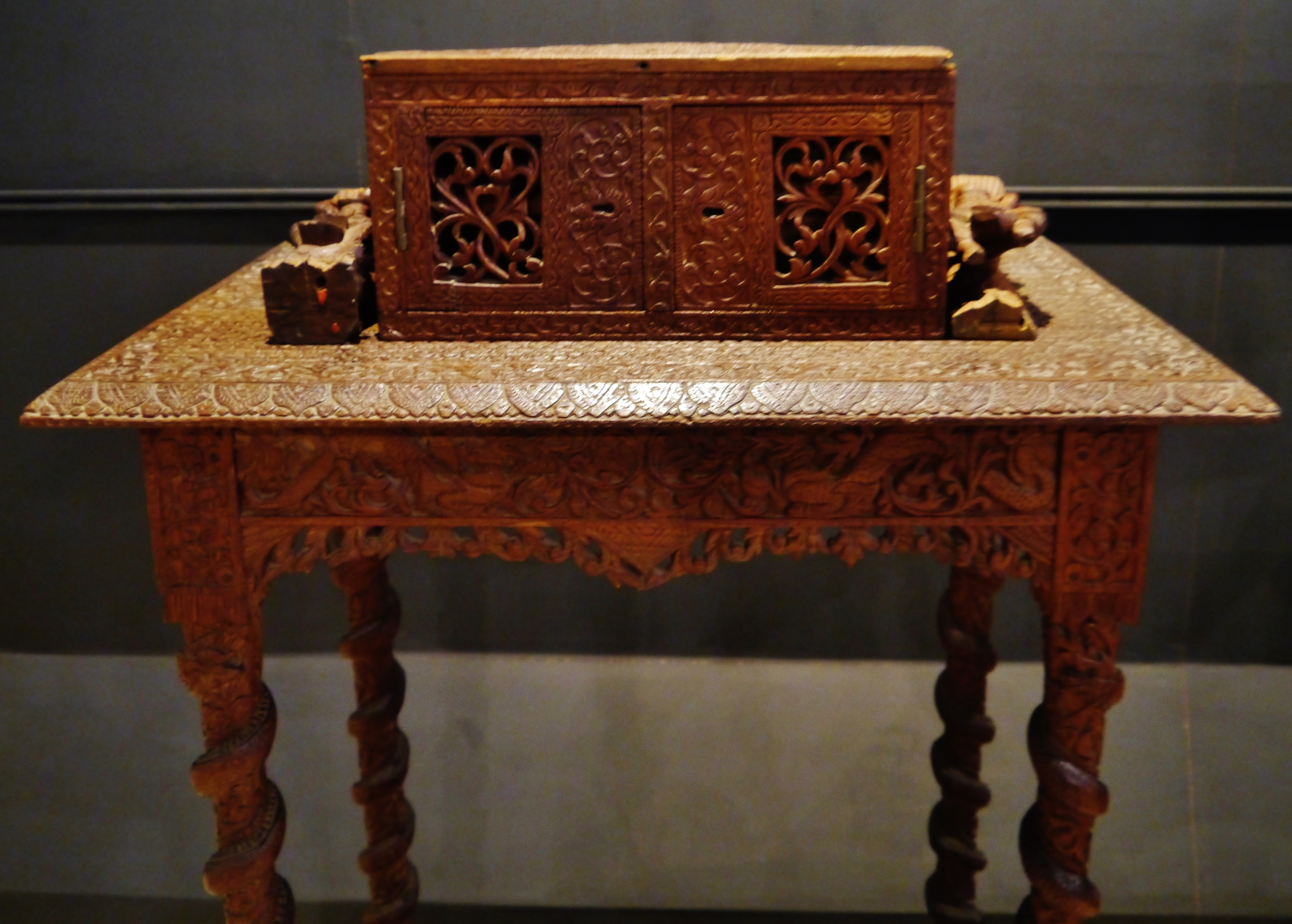
King’s table

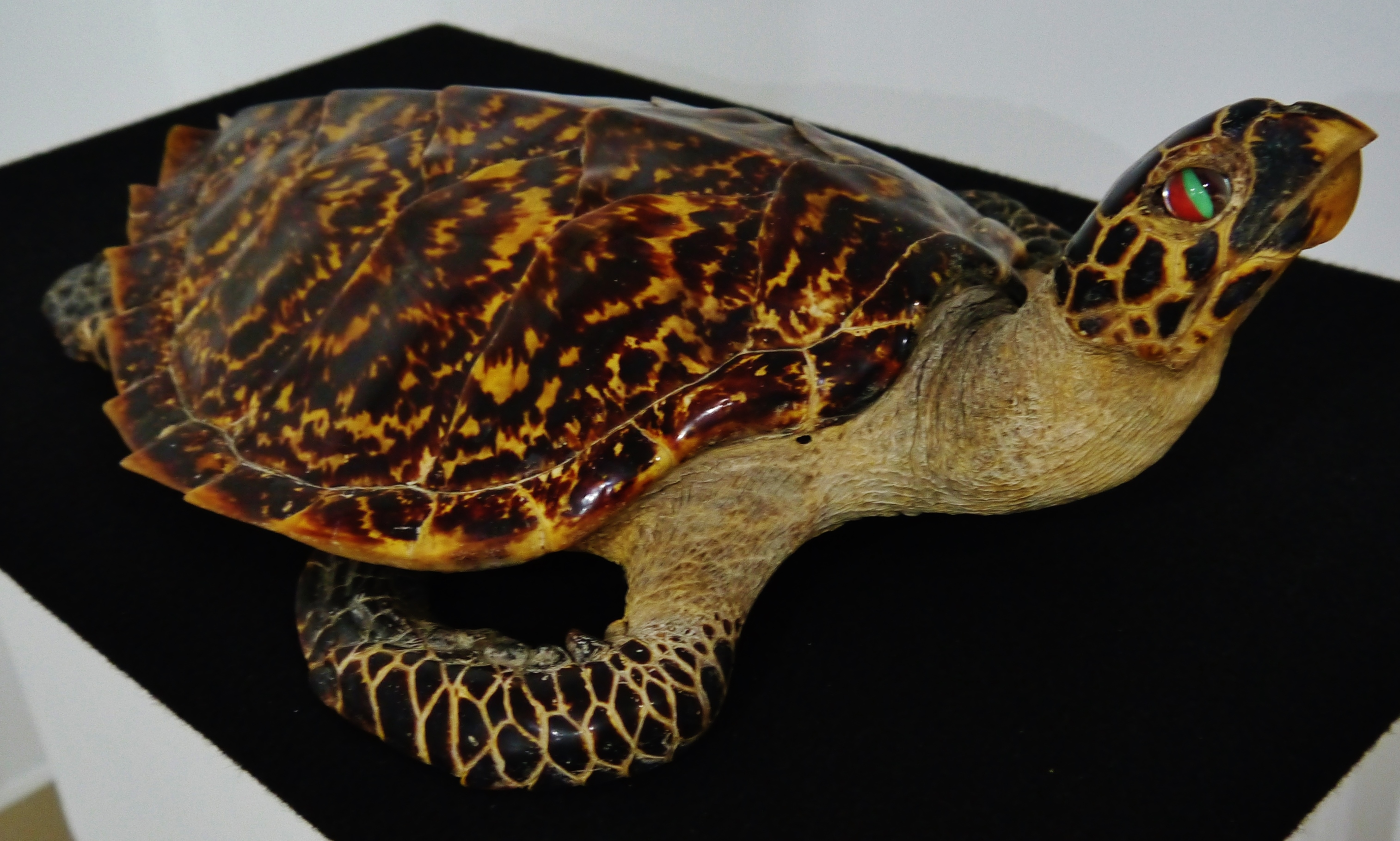
Hawksbill sea turtle

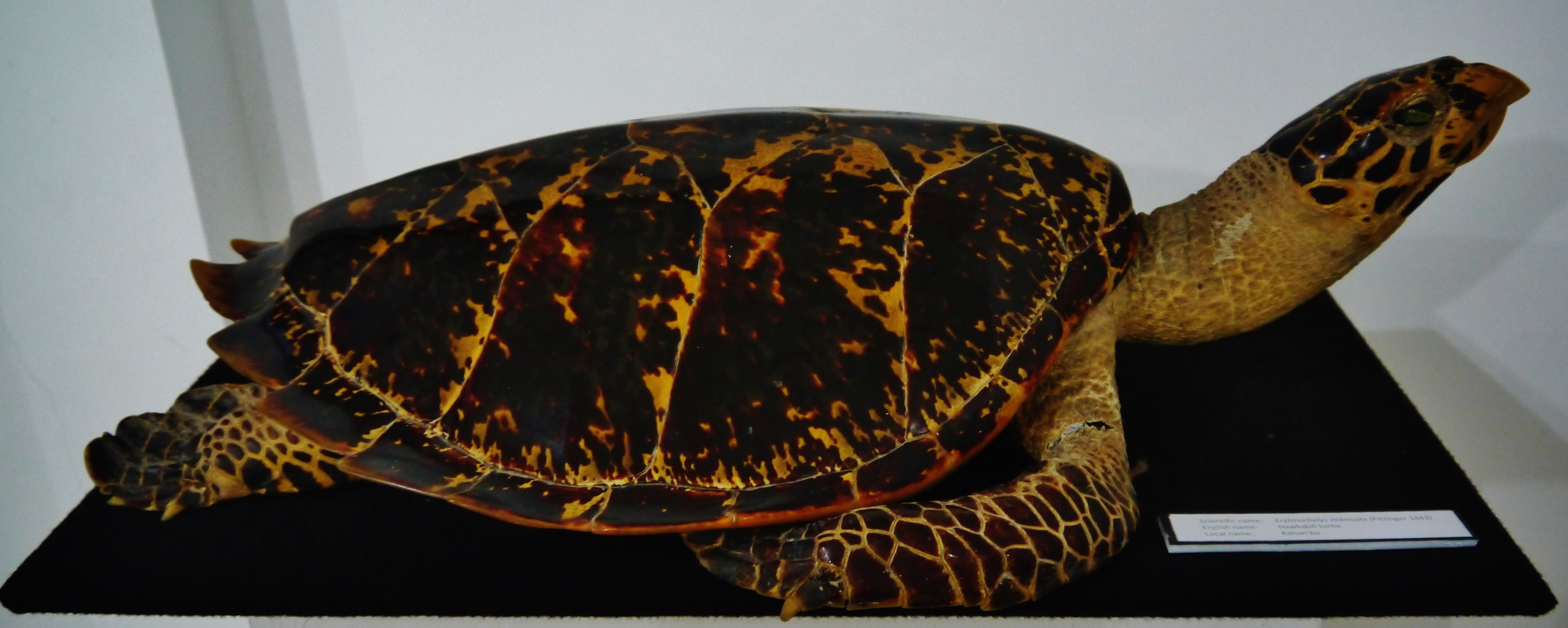
Hawksbill sea turtle

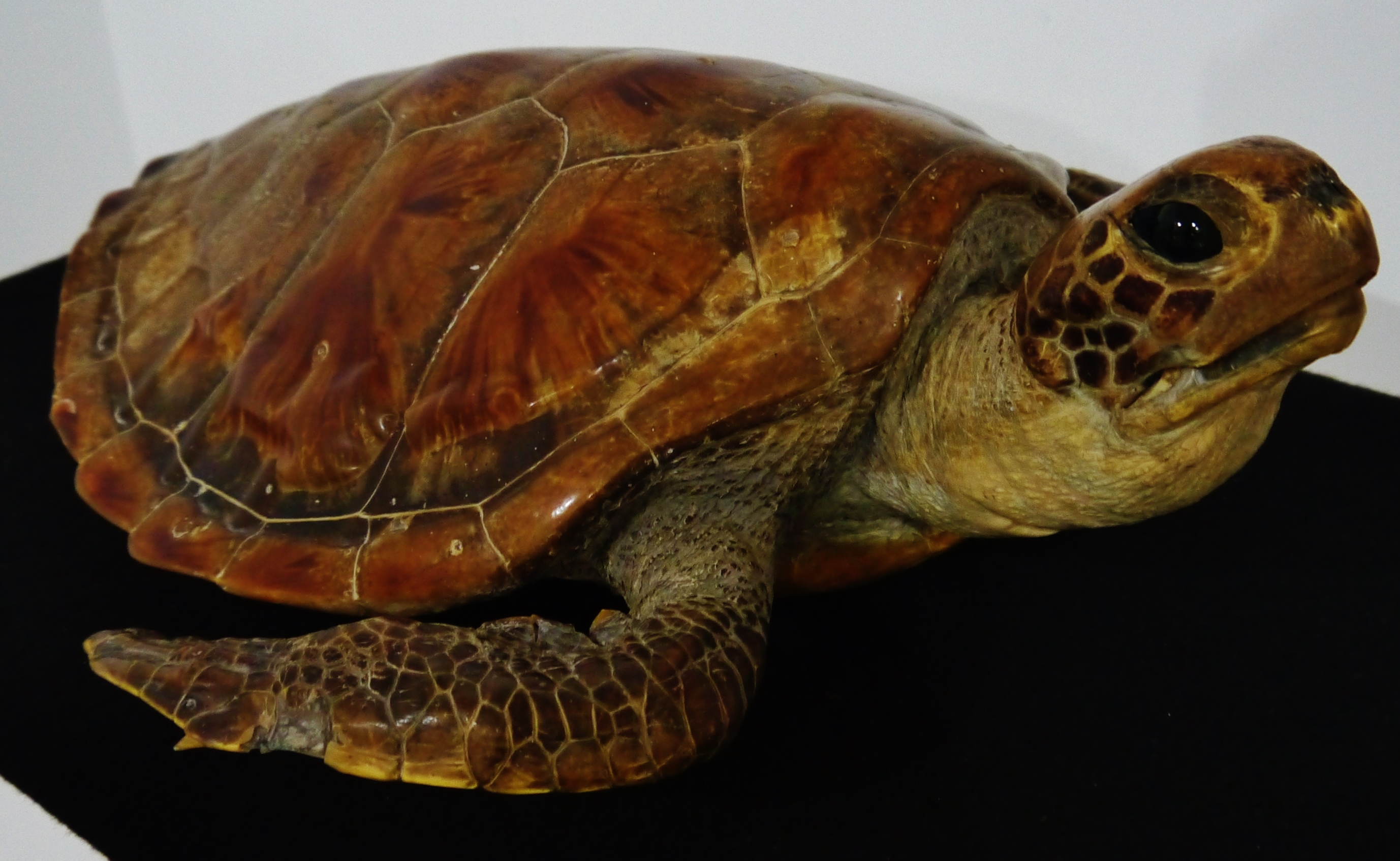
Hawksbill sea turtle

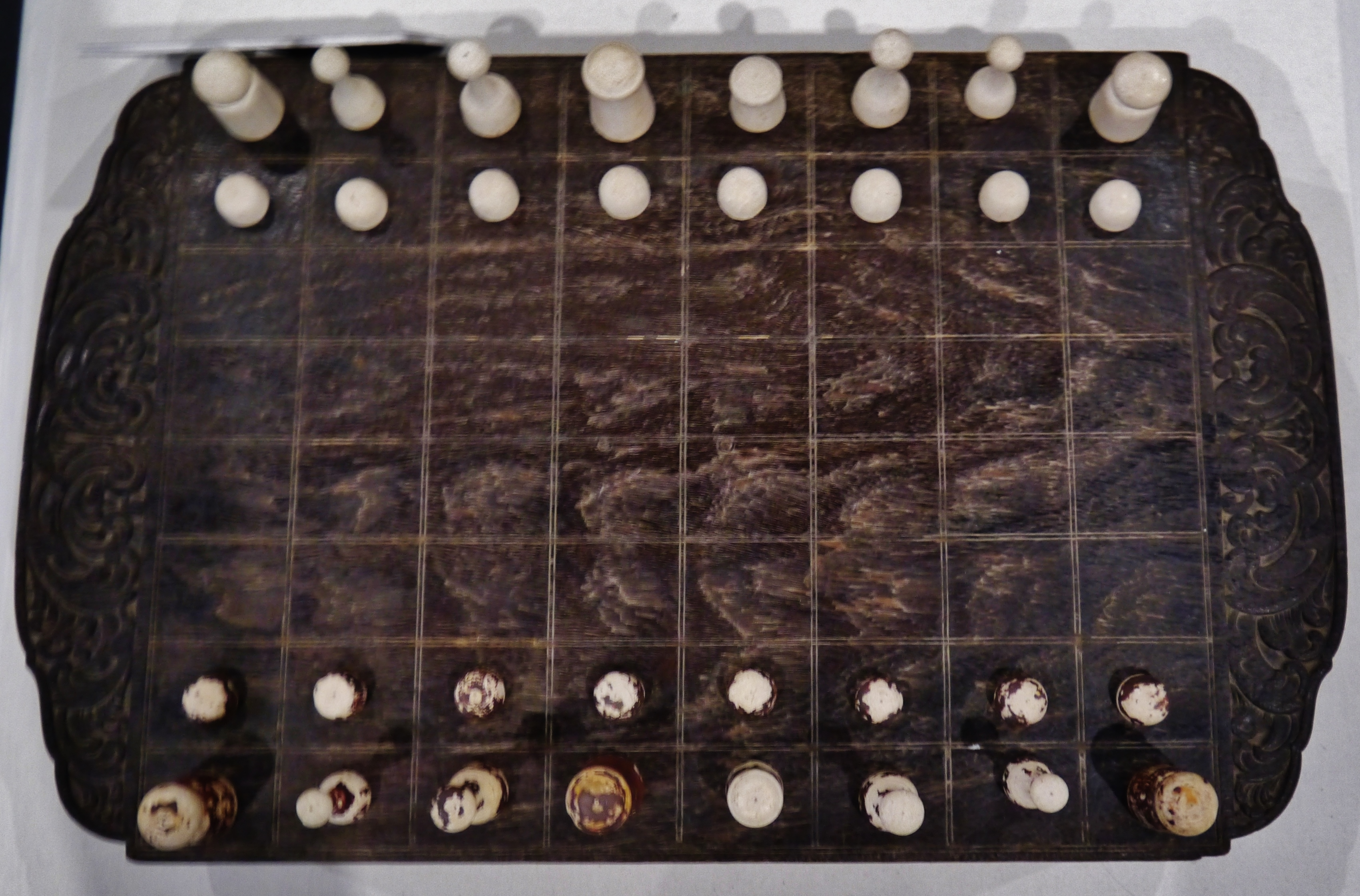
A Game at the National Museum

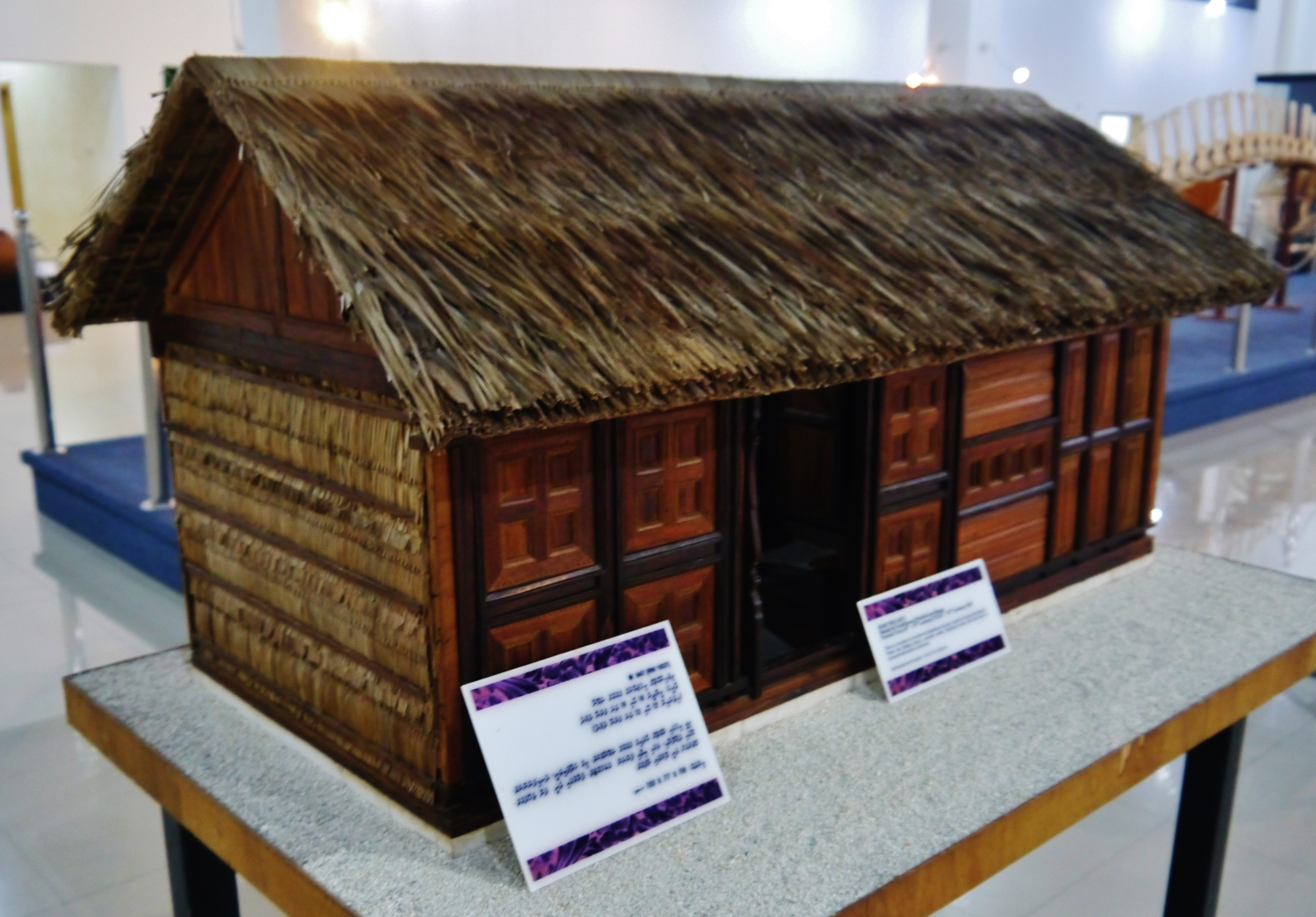
Model of a Maldivian House at the National Museum

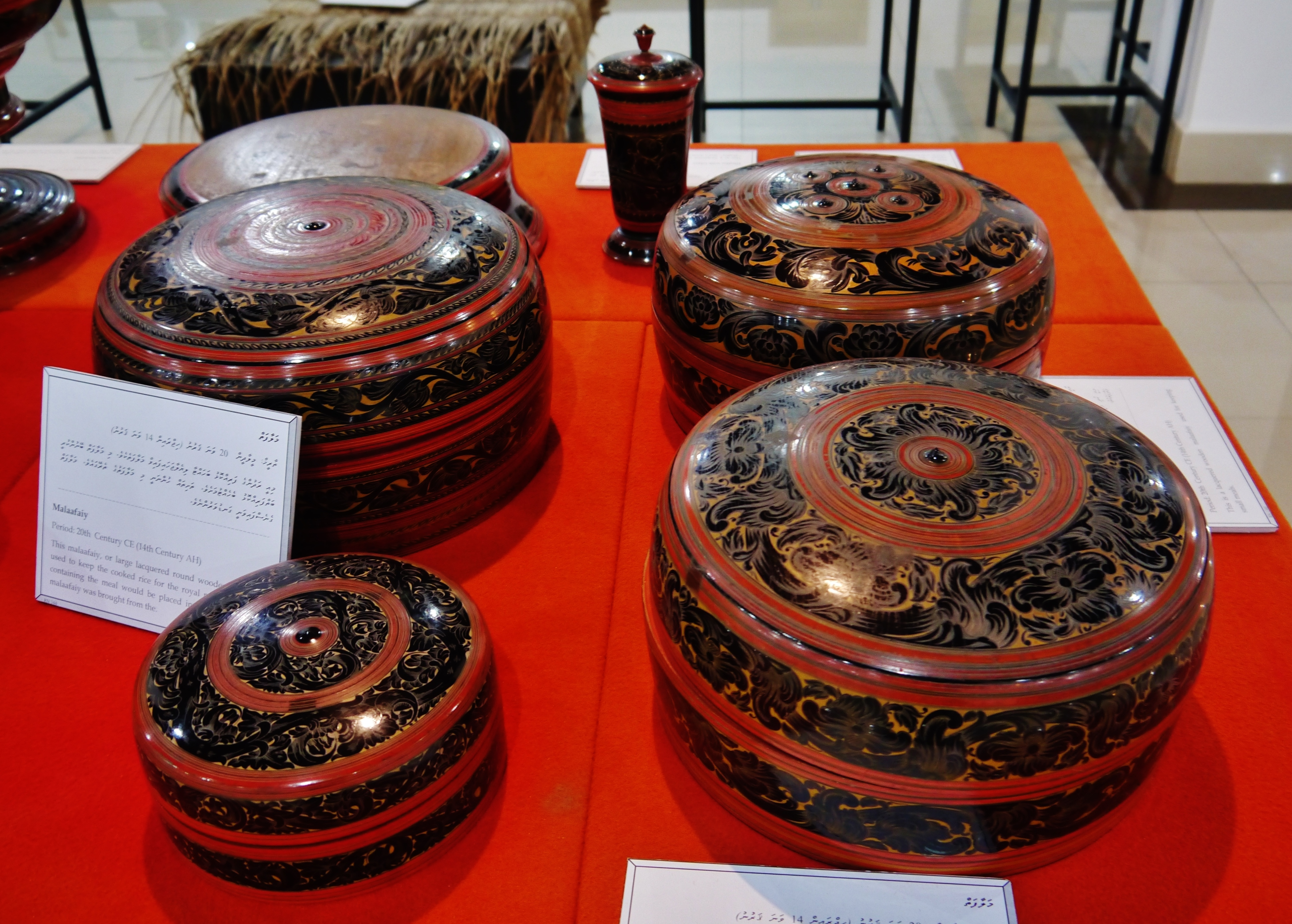
Pottery Art

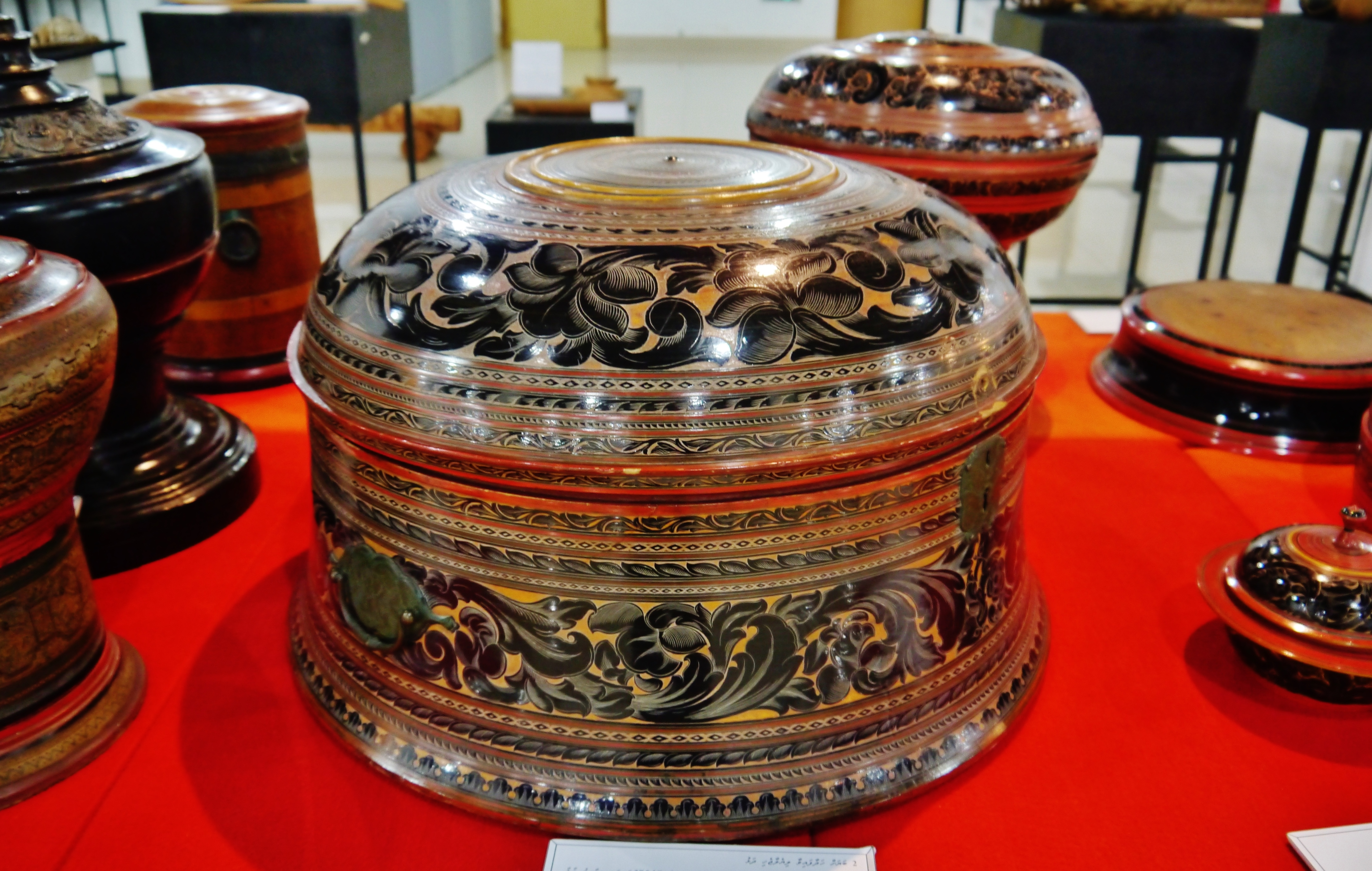
Pottery Art

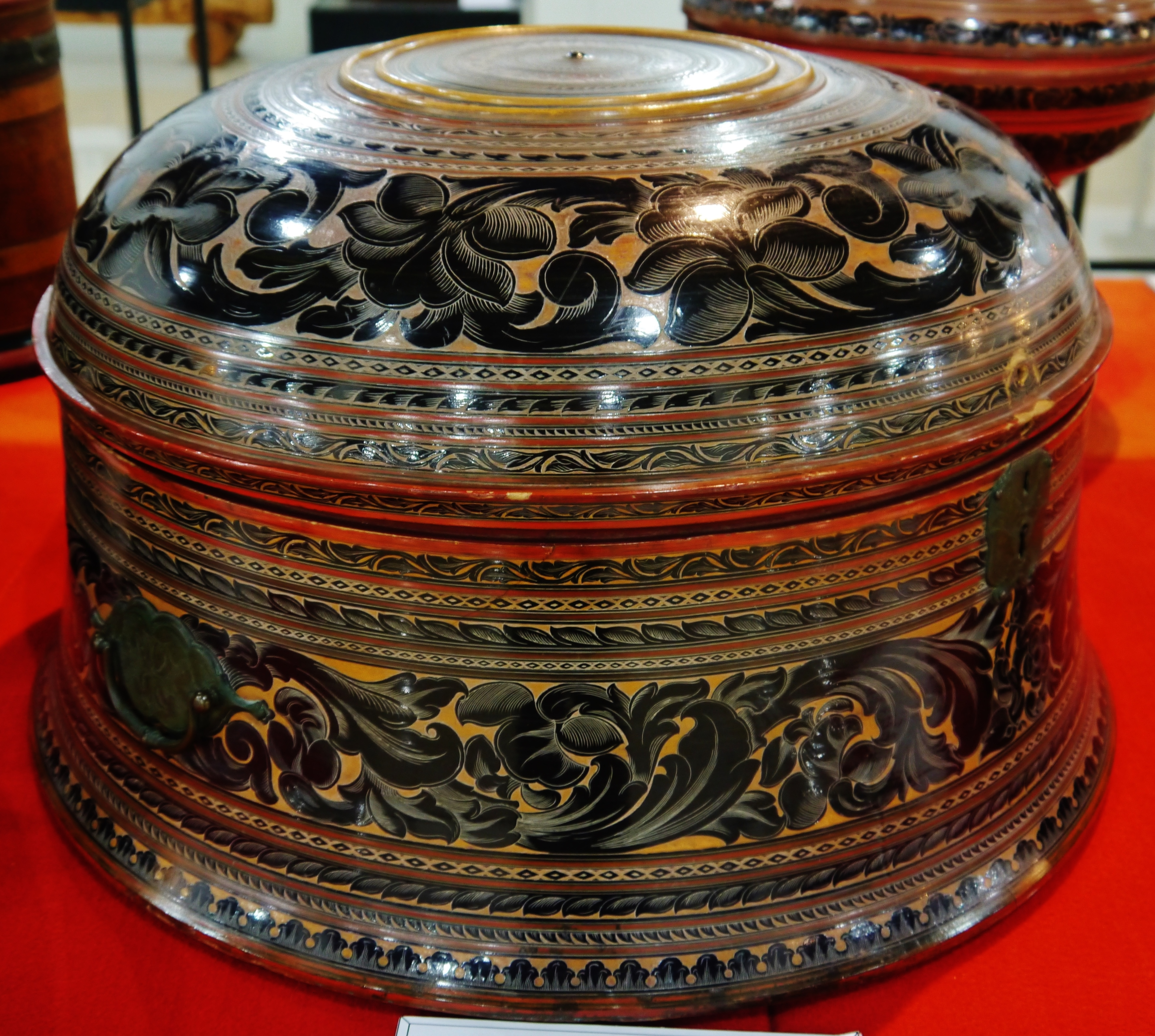
Pottery Art

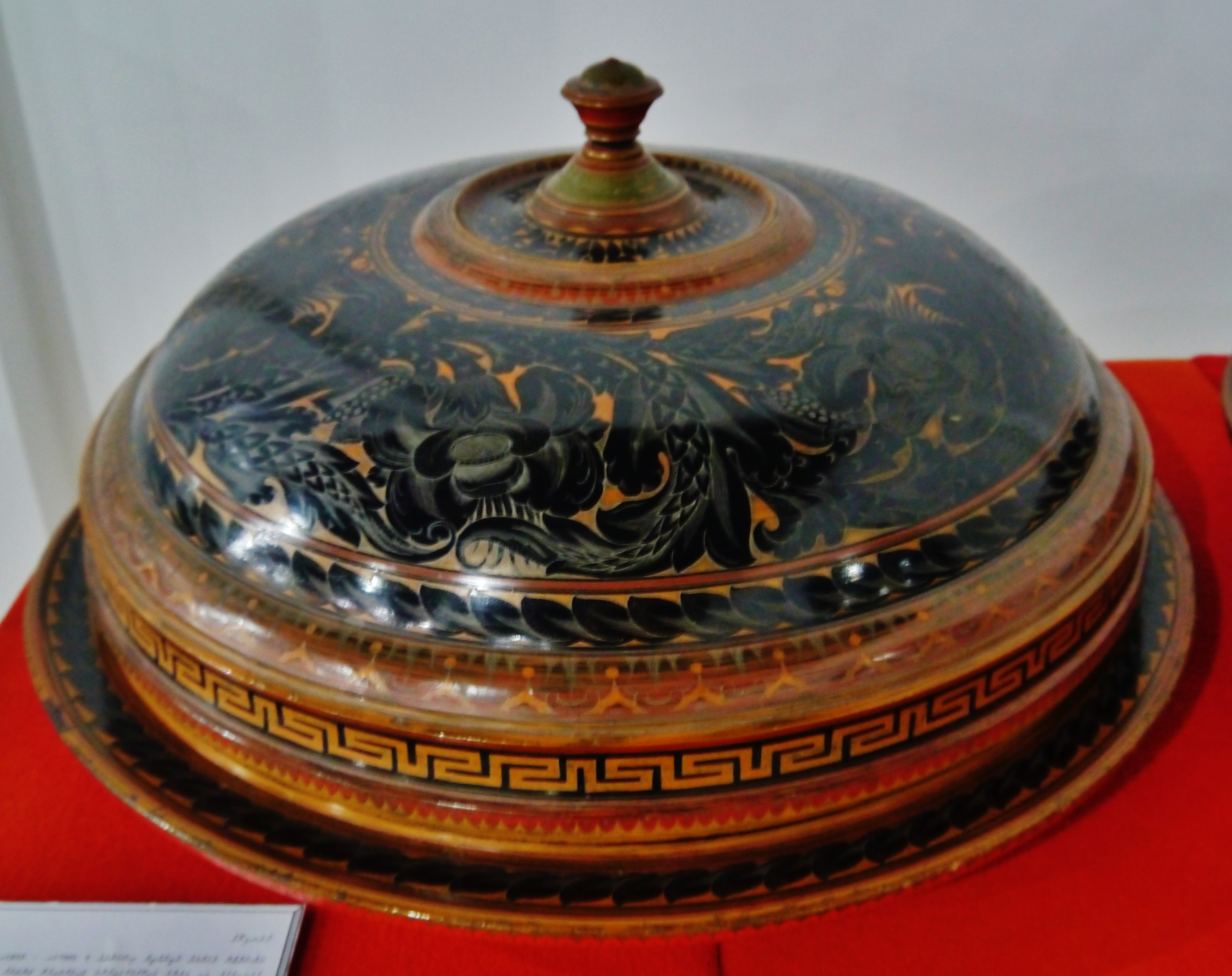
Pottery Art

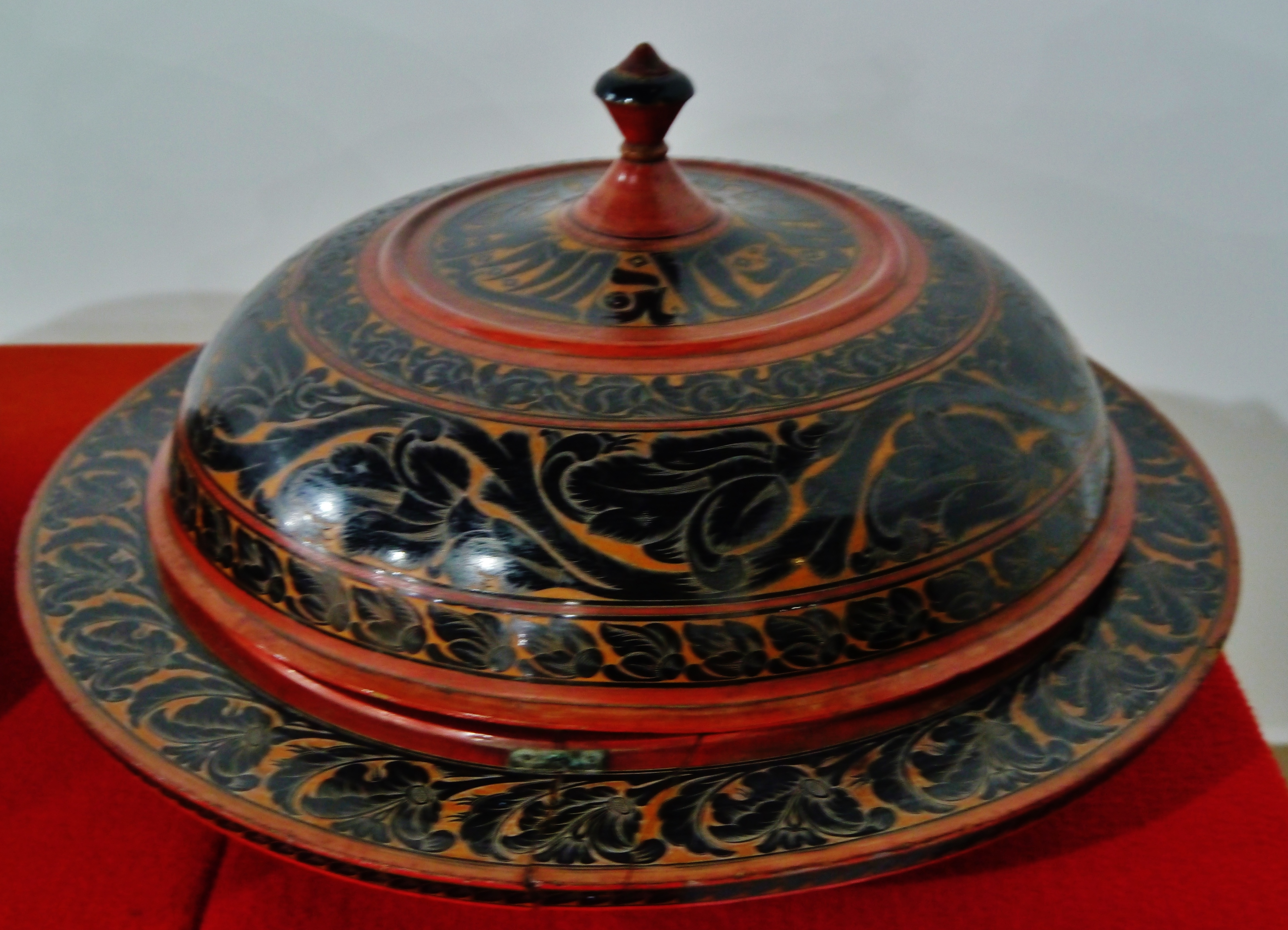
Pottery Art

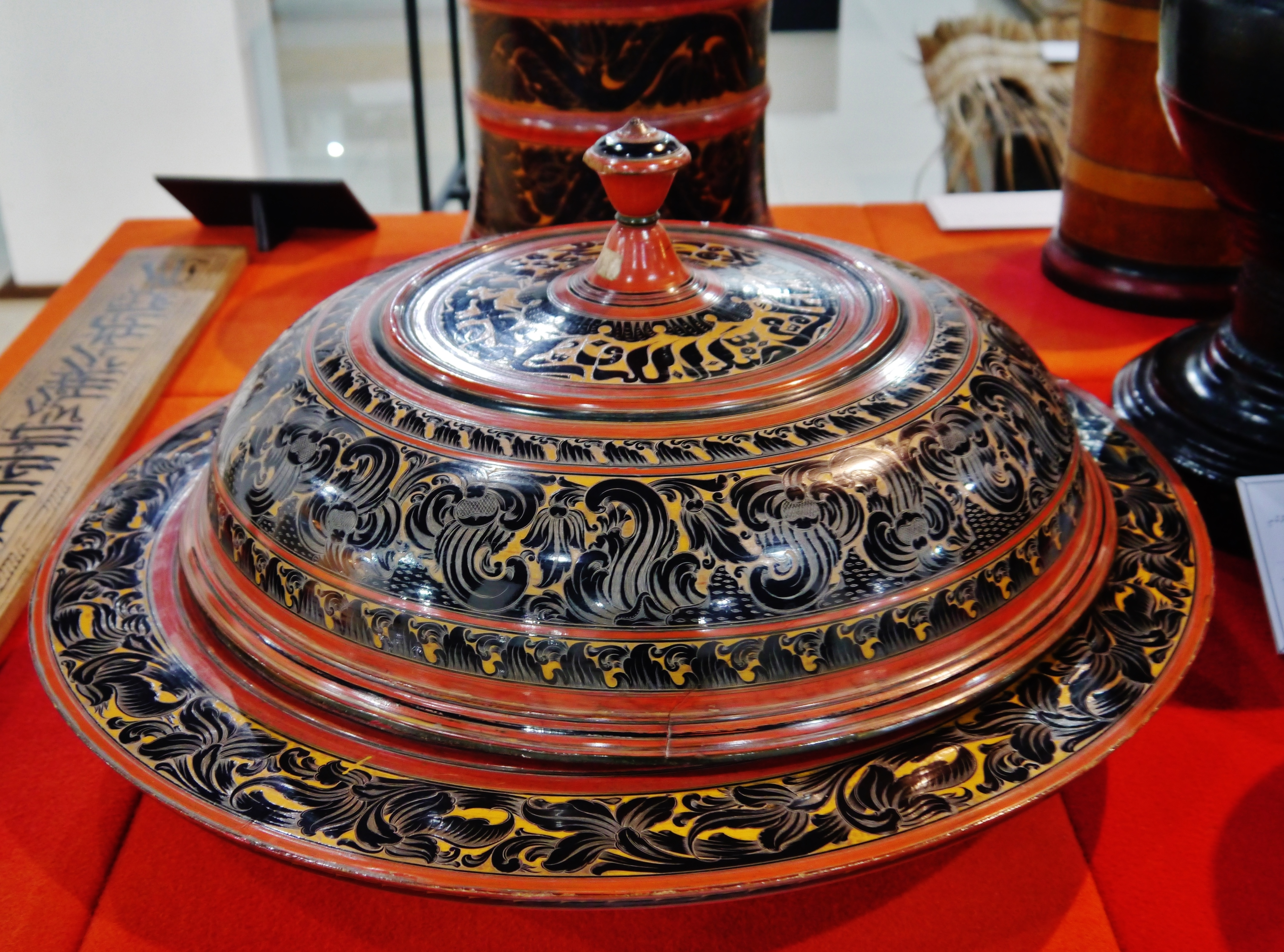
Pottery Art

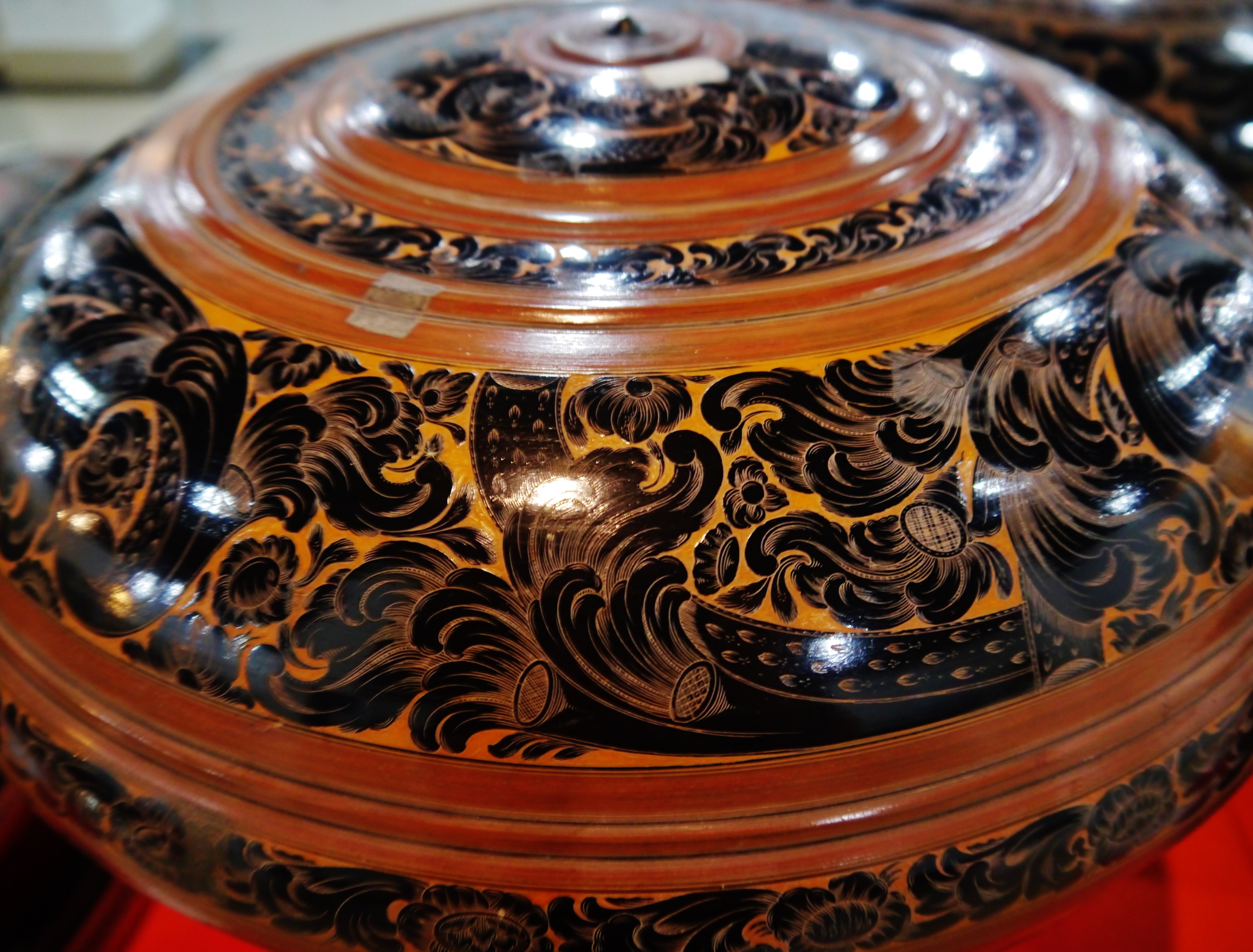
Pottery Art

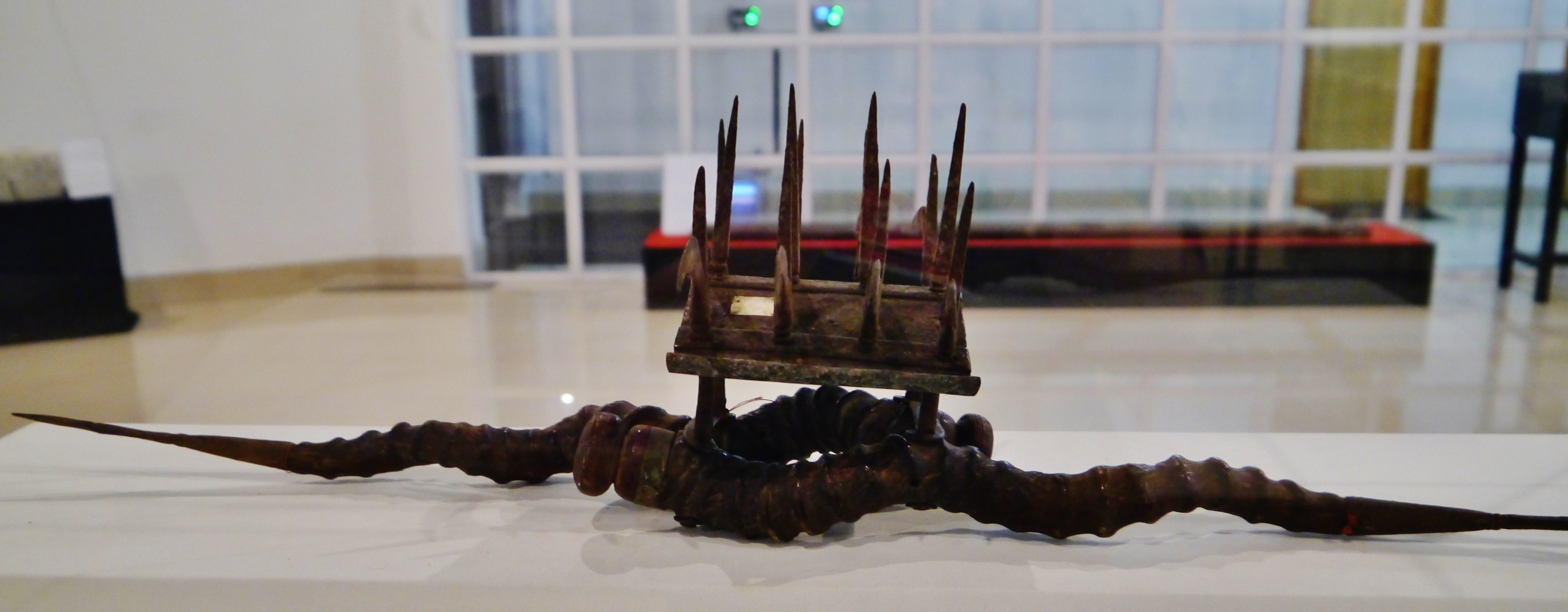
A Weapon

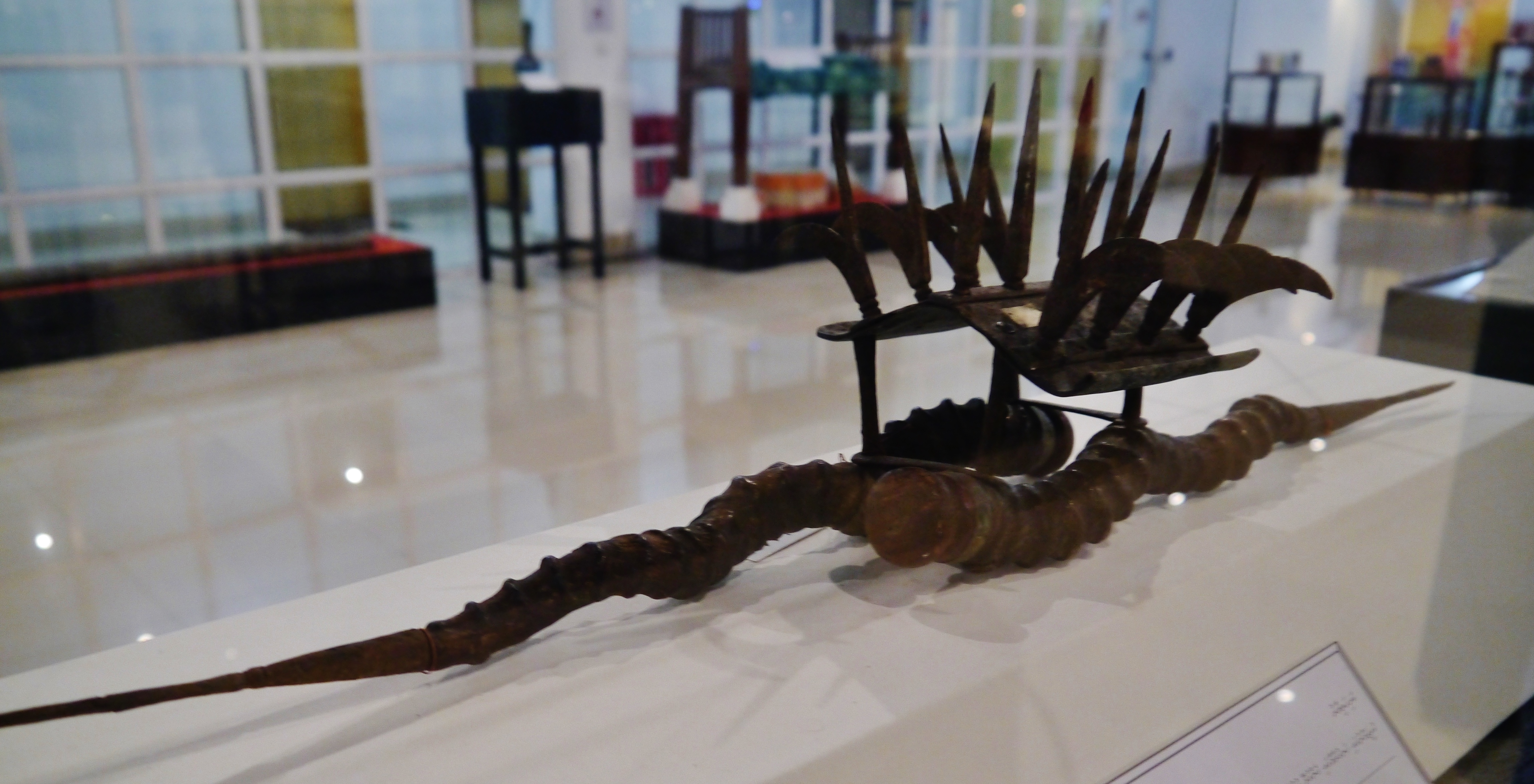
A Weapon

== See also ==
- History of the Maldives
- Islam in the Maldives
- Gemmiskiy
- Buddhism in the Maldives
- Fua Mulaku Havitta
- Kuruhinna Tharaagandu
