= 2007 Malé bombing =

2007 bombing in Sultan Park

- Location: Sultan Park near the Islamic Centre in Malé, Maldives
- Date: September 29, 2007; About 14:30 (UTC+5)
- Target: Unknown
- Attack type: Bombing
- Weapon: Home-made bomb
- Deaths: None
- Injuries: 12
- Perpetrators: 16 arrested, 5 released

The 2007 Malé bombing was a bomb blast on September 29, 2007, in Sultan Park near the Islamic Centre in the Maldivian capital Malé, injuring 6/7 foreign tourists. The park is located in the shadow Maldivian Army (MNDF) Headquarters where several surveillance cameras are trained. It was the first known bombing to take place in the Maldives.

Local media reported that the bomb was homemade, and consisted of a gas cylinder, a washing machine motor and a mobile phone. The tourists hurt were eight from China, two from Britain, and two from Japan.

A state of high alert was declared in Maldivian cities. Both the airports and ferry services in Male' were placed on high alert. The president also held a security meeting at his residence attended by Home Minister Abdullah Kamal Deen, National Security Advisor Colonel Mansoor, and Tourism Minister Mahmood Shaugy.

== Suspects ==
Within 48 hours, 12 suspects—ten Maldivian nationals and two foreigners—were arrested by police.

On October 3 at a police press conference, an assistant commissioner of police gave reporters information on two of the suspects:

Ahmed Naseer from Kanduhulhudhoo, Gaafu Alifu Atoll, and Moosa Inas from Kalhaidoo, Laamu Atoll. Both are Maldivian natives in their early twenties.

== Mosque standoff ==
A standoff occurred when Maldivian authorities investigating the explosion attempted to enter the Dar-al-Khuir mosque on the island of Himandhoo. A 40-hour standoff ensued between authorities and male congregants, ending in the arrest of 60 men and boys, and injuries to 30 police, including one whose hand was chopped off.

== Sentences ==
In December, three men were sentenced to 15 years in jail after they confessed to the bombing. Minivan Daily reported on 18 August 2010 that two of those imprisoned, Ahmed Naseer and Mohamed Sobah, had their sentences changed from incarceration to three-year suspended sentences under observation.

Indian Newspaper The Week reported that charities that served as fronts for Pakistani terrorist groups like Lashkar-e-Taiba used disaster relief missions to tsunami torn Maldives as an opportunity to recruit potential jihadists. They reported two prime suspects in the bombing, Mohamed Sobah and Ahmed Naseer, were set free in August 2010,

== International reactions ==
Singapore: The Singaporean Ministry of Foreign Affairs condemned the act of violence.
