= Solans House =

- Casa Solans (Spanish)
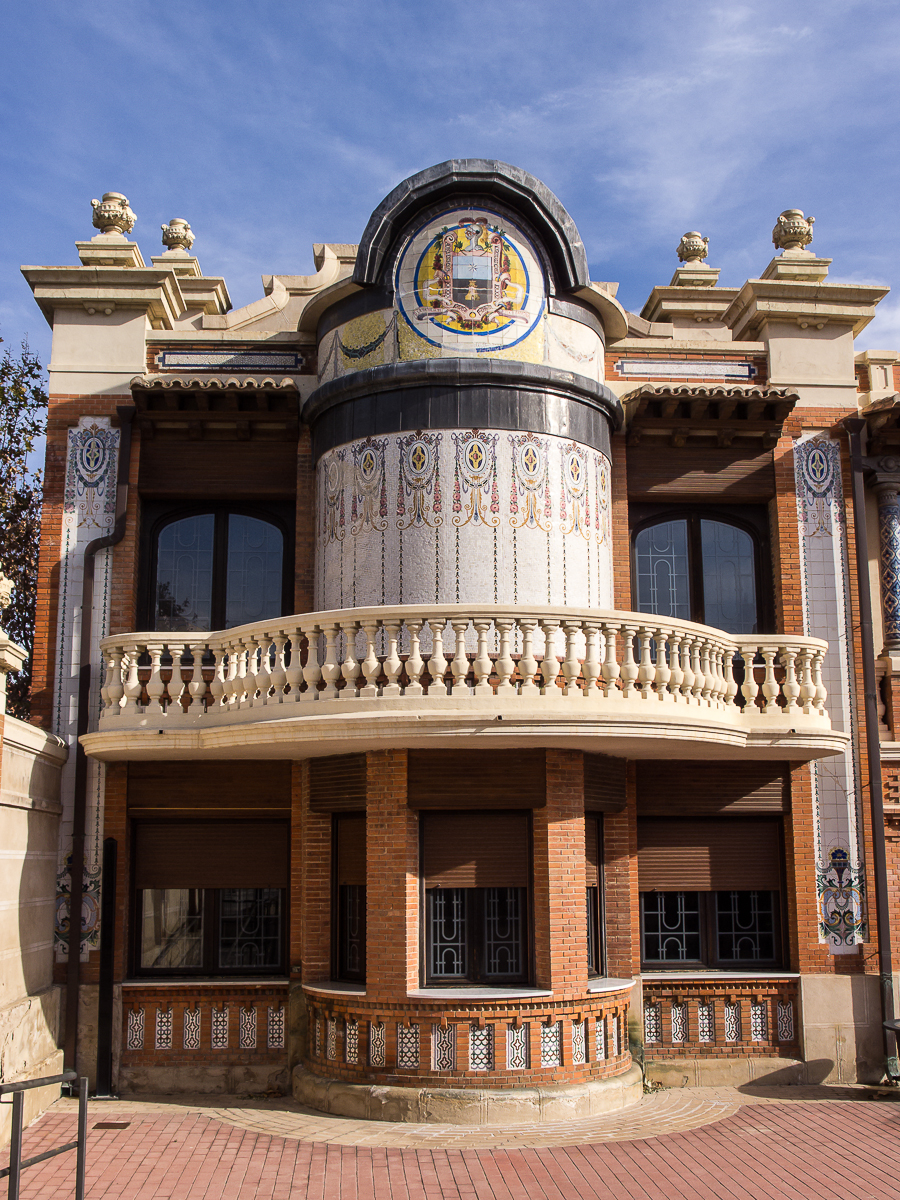
- Interactive map of Solans House
- Location: Saragossa, Spain

Site notes
- Architect: Miguel Ángel Navarro Pérez

Spanish Cultural Heritage
- Official name: Casa Solans, Casa de los Azulejos
- Criteria: Monument

The Solans House (Spanish, Casa Solans) is an Art Nouveau palace in Saragossa, Spain. It is also known as Casa de los Azulejos (House of Tiles).

Built between 1918 and 1921 to a design by the architect Miguel Ángel Navarro Pérez, it was commissioned by Juan Solans, an industrialist. In 1926, the owner died, and it became the property of the widow and nephew of the deceased in equal parts. After a long period of abandonment, the building was restored, and was used as the headquarters of the United Nations Office of Support to the Water Decade until 2015.
