= Suzanne Pitama =

New Zealand researcher and academic

Suzanne G. Pitama
- Education: University of Otago, Christchurch
- Awards: AKO Aotearoa Prime Minister's Supreme Award for tertiary teaching excellence Dame Joan Metge Medal for research in social sciences Dame Marie Clay Award (2023)
- Scientific career
- Fields: Māori indigenous health
- Workplaces: University of Otago, Christchurch
- Thesis: "As natural as learning pathology": the design, implementation and impact of indigenous health curricula within medical schools (2013)
- Doctoral advisor: Tim Wilkinson; Catherine Savage; Pauline Barnett

Suzanne Georgina Pitama is a New Zealand academic, is Māori, of Ngāti Kahungunu and Ngāti Whare descent and as of 2020 is a full professor at the University of Otago in Christchurch, New Zealand.

== Early life ==
Pitama was educated at Wairoa College, and qualified in psychology at University of Auckland. She then undertook postgraduate and doctoral studies at Massey University and the University of Otago.

== Academic career ==
Pitama was already a registered clinical psychologist before she completed the first-ever PhD undertaken in indigenous medical education, submitting her thesis, "As natural as learning pathology": the design, implementation and impact of indigenous health curricula within medical schools, at the University of Otago in 2013. Pitama was promoted to full professor from February 2020. In December 2021, she was appointed Dean and Head of Campus at the University of Otago, Christchurch, effective February 2022.

Pitama's research focuses on indigenous experiences in the health system, and how medical education can improve health disparities.

== Awards ==
In 2015, Pitama received the AKO Aotearoa Prime Minister's Supreme Award for tertiary teaching excellence. In 2017 Pitama featured as one of the Royal Society Te Apārangi's 150 women in 150 words. Pitama was also awarded the 2018 Metge Medal for 'excellence and building relationships in the social science research community'. Pitama was also awarded the 2023 Dame Marie Clay Award by the New Zealand Psychological Society.

Pitama is the Director of the Māori/Indigenous Health Institute (MIHI) at the University of Otago.

In February 2022, she became university's first Māori female Dean of a medical school campus, when she became the Dean and Head of Campus at the University of Otago, Christchurch.

== Selected works ==
- Suzanne G Pitama; Suetonia C Palmer; Tania Huria; Cameron Lacey; Tim Wilkinson (22 June 2018). "Implementation and impact of indigenous health curricula: a systematic review". Medical Education. 52 (9): 898–909. doi:10.1111/medu.13613. ISSN 0308-0110. PMID 29932221. Wikidata Q89186113.
- Suetonia C Palmer; Harriet Gray; Tania Huria; Cameron Lacey; Lutz Beckert; Suzanne G Pitama (28 October 2019). "Reported Māori consumer experiences of health systems and programs in qualitative research: a systematic review with meta-synthesis". International Journal for Equity in Health. 18 (1): 163. doi:10.1186/s12939-019-1057-4. ISSN 1475-9276. PMC 6816189. PMID 31660988. Wikidata Q90984196.
- Suzanne Pitama; Tania Huria; Maira Patu; Cameron Lacey (10 October 2020). "Commentary on Impaired Wellness in Medicine: A Collectivist perspective". Medical Education (in English and English). 55 (1): 4–5. doi:10.1111/medu.14393. ISSN 0308-0110. PMID 33037827. Wikidata Q100513193.
- Suzanne Pitama; J. Elisabeth Wells; Allamanda Faatoese; et al. (1 June 2011). "A Kaupapa Māori approach to a community cohort study of heart disease in New Zealand". Australian and New Zealand Journal of Public Health. 35 (3): 249–255. doi:10.1111/j.1753-6405.2011.00702.x. ISSN 1326-0200. PMID 21627725. Wikidata Q39985246.
- Jennifer Desrosiers; Tim Wilkinson; Gillian Abel; Suzanne Pitama (18 October 2016). "Curricular initiatives that enhance student knowledge and perceptions of sexual and gender minority groups: a critical interpretive synthesis". Canadian medical education journal. 7 (2): e121–e138. ISSN 1923-1202. PMC 5344050. PMID 28344699. Wikidata Q37691194.
- Manar Khashram; Suzanne Pitama; Jonathan A. Williman; Gregory T Jones; Justin A Roake (10 October 2017). "Survival Disparity Following Abdominal Aortic Aneurysm Repair Highlights Inequality in Ethnic and Socio-economic Status". European Journal of Vascular and Endovascular Surgery. 54 (6): 689–696. doi:10.1016/j.ejvs.2017.08.018. ISSN 1078-5884. PMID 29029952. Wikidata Q42696863.
