= Prostitution in New Zealand =

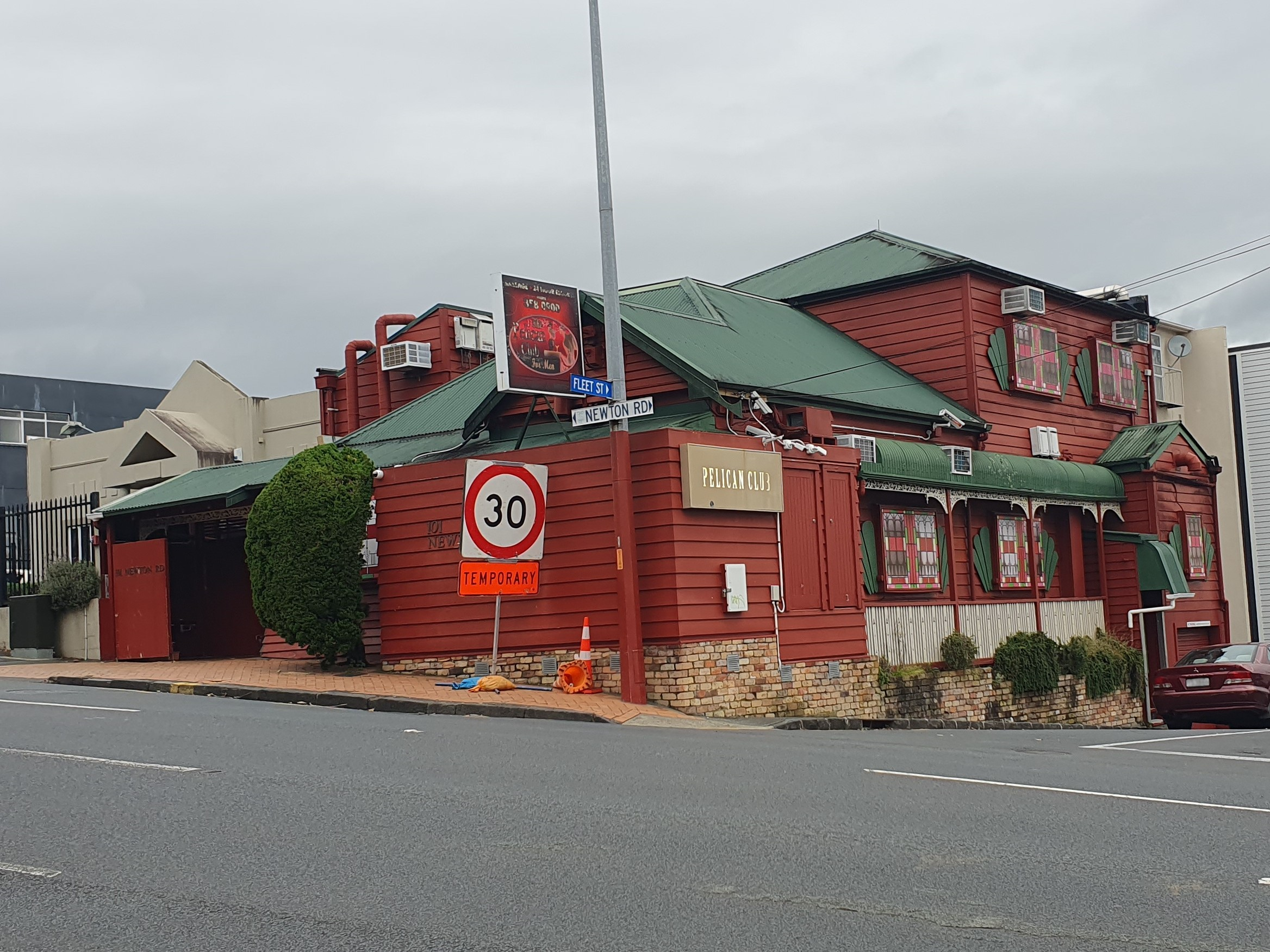
The Pelican Club, a massage parlour / escort agency in Newton, Auckland

In New Zealand, prostitution, brothel-keeping, living off the proceeds of someone else's prostitution, and street solicitation have been legal since the Prostitution Reform Act 2003 came into effect. Coercion of sex workers is illegal. The 2003 decriminalisation of brothels, escort agencies and soliciting, and the substitution of a minimal regulatory model, created worldwide interest; New Zealand prostitution laws are now some of the most liberal in the world.

Until 2003, indoor prostitution in New Zealand was governed by the Massage Parlours Act 1978, which allowed brothels to operate under the guise of massage parlours. However, the act defined massage parlours as public places, so laws against soliciting in a public place applied to workers in parlours, and they were sometimes raided by police posing as clients. Workers in the parlours were also required to provide their names and addresses to the police. Advertising the sale of sex ("soliciting"), running a brothel, and living off the earnings of prostitution were illegal.

Despite the Massage Parlours Act and other laws meant to suppress prostitution, there was considerable toleration of sex work in practice in the last decades of the 20th century. These laws were all changed by the Prostitution Reform Act in June 2003.

== History ==
=== Before 2003 ===
The early examples of the exchange of sex for material gain in New Zealand occurred in the early period of contact between indigenous Māori and European and American sailors. Along with food, water, and timber, sex was one of the major commodities exchanged for European goods. The Bay of Islands and in particular the town of Kororareka was notorious for this and brothels proliferated. It is not clear whether all of these exchanges necessarily constituted prostitution in the usual sense of the word. In some cases, the sex may have been part of a wider partnership between a tribe and a ship's crew, akin to a temporary marriage alliance. The amount of choice women had about their participation seems to have varied. Throughout this period there was a severe gender imbalance in the settler population and women were in short supply.

In the 19th century, prostitution was generally referred to as the "Social Evil". As with other British dependencies, New Zealand inherited both statute and case law from the United Kingdom, for instance the UK's Vagrancy Act 1824 was in force until New Zealand passed its own Vagrant Act 1866.

These included reference to the common prostitute. New Zealand was also amongst those dependencies that followed the British authorities in passing a Contagious Diseases Act (regulation system); New Zealand's Contagious Diseases Act 1869 was in force until repealed by the Contagious Diseases Act Repeal Act 1910. The Women's Christian Temperance Union New Zealand continuously found for repeal of the Contagious Diseases Act 1869 and ramped up its petitions and public letters with data from convictions in courts to prove how the law protected male predators and kept girls and women of all classes vulnerable to assault. It was an oppressive act, based on the belief, expressed officially even in the 1922 report, that women represented vectors for the spread of venereal diseases. It was replaced by the Social Hygiene Act 1917, although these fears reappeared throughout the British Empire in both World Wars.

In the post-war period, the concern was more with "promiscuity", although prostitution was seen as an extreme form of this. The gendered rationale and practice of venereal disease policy formed a focus for early feminist activism.

Prostitution-related statute law passed in the second half of the 20th century included the Crimes Act 1961, the Massage Parlours Act 1978, and the Summary Offences Act 1981. Section 26 of the Summary Offences Act prohibited soliciting, S 147 of the Crimes Act prohibited brothel-keeping, and S 148 living on the earnings of prostitution, and S 149 procuring. In 2000, the Crimes Act was amended to criminalise both clients and operators where workers were aged under 18 (the age of consent for sexual activity is 16). Young people under 18 were still classed as offenders after this came into force, until the passage of the Prostitution Reform Act 2003.

The Massage Parlours Act effectively allowed indoor commercial sex under a facade. Prostitutes advertised their services as "escorts", and brothels advertised themselves as "massage parlours". Workers in "massage parlours" were required to be registered with the police from the time the Massage Parlours Act 1978 came into force. In the mid-1990s, the police extended this registration ex-officio to other indoor workers in some areas of the country. The police had approached media outlets letting them know that they may be "aiding and abetting" sex workers committing crimes (such as brothel-keeping, etc.), and told the media that they should require such registration before accepting advertisements.

=== Prostitution Reform Act 2003 ===
In 1997, a number of groups came together to hold a Women's Forum in Wellington, out of which a working group developed to draft a bill, including the NZPC, academics, women's groups (New Zealand Federation of Business and Professional Women, National Council of Women of New Zealand, YWCA), and the AIDS Foundation. Other individuals included legal volunteers and MPs, in particular Maurice Williamson (National, Pakuranga 1987–2017), Associate Minister of Health (1990–1996), and Katherine O'Regan (National, Waipa 1984–1996, List 1996–1999), who championed the bill in parliament.

Labour returned to power (1999–2008), and Tim Barnett (Labour Christchurch Central 1996–2008) assumed responsibility for introducing it as a Private Member's Bill to decriminalise prostitution. This was based on the harm reduction model of New South Wales (1996). The bill was introduced on 21 September 2000, and placed in the ballot box, being drawn as number 3 and debated on 8 November as Bill 66-1 (87:21), passing first reading 87:21. Party support came from the Greens, notably Sue Bradford (List, 1999–2009). It was opposed by New Zealand First, who proposed the Swedish approach of criminalising the purchase of sex. It then proceeded to select committee (Justice and Electoral), which received 222 submissions and heard 66 submissions, amending and reporting in favour of the Bill on 29 November 2002, following the 2002 election, the bill now being referred to as Bill 66-2. Dissenting minority opinions were recorded by the National, New Zealand First, ACT New Zealand, and United Future members. This was a Private Member's Bill, and theoretically, members were allowed a conscience vote. However, the three members of the 1999–2002 coalition (Labour, Greens, Alliance) all had decriminalisation in their manifestos. Later, the Prime Minister, Helen Clark, lent her support to the bill.

During the parliamentary debates and committees, support came from some women's rights groups, some human rights groups, and some public health groups. The police were neutral. Some feminists opposed the decriminalisation of brothels and pimping (see feminist views on prostitution), Christian groups were divided, and fundamentalist religious groups, including Right to Life, were opposed.

The Prostitution Reform Act (PRA) passed its third reading on 25 June 2003. This bill passed narrowly; of 120 member of parliaments, 60 voted for it, 59 against, and one politician, Labour's Ashraf Choudhary, the country's only Muslim MP, abstained. The result was a surprise, as most commentators had expected the bill to fail. An impassioned speech to parliament by Georgina Beyer, a transgender woman and former sex worker, was believed by many observers to have persuaded several wavering MPs, possibly including Mr Choudhary, to change their votes at the last minute.

The Act replaced the previous legislation, including repealing the Massage Parlours Act, largely removing voluntary adult (age 18 and over) prostitution from the criminal law and replacing it with civil law at both national and local level. A distinction was made between voluntary and involuntary prostitution. It remains a crime to coerce someone to provide sexual services. Sex work is also prohibited for those on temporary visas, and immigration for and investment in sex work is prohibited. Contracts between provider and client were recognised, and providers have the right to refuse services. Contested contracts can be referred to the Disputes Tribunal. Advertising is banned, with the exception of print media, which is restricted. The Summary Offences Act remains in force in relation to soliciting, which may be classed as offensive behaviour. The Criminal Records (Clean Slate) Act 2004 also allows sex workers to apply for previous convictions to be removed from the record. Sex work is recognised (but not promoted) as legitimate work by Work and Income New Zealand, who may not advertise vacancies in brothels or suggest people start sex work as a means of getting off a benefit. Now, workplace safety and health rules, developed in consultation with the prostitutes' collective, apply to sex work. Employment disputes can be referred to the Labour Inspectorate and Mediation Service. There is an obligation on employers and employees to practise and promote safe sexual practices. The Ministry of Health has the responsibility for enforcement. Registration of indoor sex workers with the police was replaced by certification at an administrative law level of brothel operators. Prior records have been destroyed. Refusal of a certificate is permitted for prior criminal offences (not necessarily related to prostitution). Police activities changed from the registration and prosecution of sex workers to protection. The Police Manual of Best Practice was amended to include prostitution.

Local government was empowered to develop by-laws for zoning and advertising, but not prohibit sex work.

In summary, the Act decriminalised soliciting, living off the proceeds of someone else's prostitution, and brothel-keeping.

Following passage of the Act, the Maxim Institute and other conservative Christian organisations tried to gain an appropriate number of signatures for a citizens-initiated referendum under the Citizens Initiated Referendum Act 1993. The initiative was sponsored by two United Future MPs, Gordon Copeland, the bill's most outspoken critic, and Larry Baldock. Although it was allowed an extension, anti-prostitution groups fell well short of gaining the number of authenticated signatures required for a citizen-initiated referendum.

Local Government New Zealand provided model by-laws and procedures. Court challenges have usually failed to uphold more restrictive council by-laws. By 2006, 17 of 74 local governments had drafted or implemented by-laws.

==== 2008 evaluation ====
To help counter criticism, the Prostitution Reform Act included a requirement that a review of the effects of the new law had to be conducted three to five years after it came into force. An initial report in September 2006 indicated that the number of sex workers on the streets was approximately the same as before the Act came into force and, in some cases, even slightly reduced, contrary to allegations that it has increased. The extent of sex work was compared to 1999, the only notable change being a trend from managed sex work to the private sector. An examination of entry and exit factors showed that many sex workers said they desired to continue to sell sex, as financial return and independence were attractive features. Workers seemed more empowered, but there was still violence on the streets. It is clear that the Act did not decriminalise violence, and the police take action about violence when sex workers make complaints (cf., R v Connolly, a police officer who was jailed in 2009 for blackmailing a sex worker into giving him free sex). Some deficiencies in safe practices, especially for oral sex, were identified. Perceived stigma remained a problem. Inconsistencies were noted between local and central government intent, the former being more restrictive, causing problems for some workers.

The Prostitution Law Review Committee presented its final report in May 2008. It found no evidence for the claims of critics at the time of introduction, and it concluded that there was no expansion of the industry. However, employment conditions still left a good deal to be desired. Stigma remained a major problem, and the traditional distrust of authorities also remained. Sex workers are now more willing to report crimes against them than they had been in the past.

Following the release of the evaluation, suggestions of bias were raised, and critics such as the evangelical Christian TEAR Fund's Humanitarian Chronicle stated that authors of the report were "supporters" of the sex industry and thus not "neutral". They stated that the situation was much worse than presented in the evaluation. Alex Penk, Maxim Institute's Policy and Research Manager, said that: "The report released by the Prostitution Law Review Committee today clearly shows that the Prostitution Reform Act is not making life safer for many of New Zealand's most vulnerable men, women, and young people."

Melissa Farley, an opponent of the legislation, stated that the decriminalisation of prostitution had very negative effects (e. g., an increase in human trafficking and street prostitution), and that the NZ Prostitution Law Review Committee "was biased and blatantly favoured the sex industry". However, Farley has been criticised for failing to provide any facts or details to back up her assertions. Furthermore, Farley continues to use a claim that "the numbers of those prostituting on the street in Auckland have increased by 400% since decriminalization". During an online debate in The Economist, Farley repeated these figures, claiming at paragraph 35:

Since decriminalisation, street prostitution has spiralled out of control, especially in New Zealand's largest city, Auckland. A 200–400% increase in street prostitution has been reported.

However, in reply to the claims Farley and others make, the Prostitution Law Review Committee (2008: 40) stated:

In the Committee's first report, the number of street-based sex workers in Auckland was estimated to be 360 (PLRC, 2005). An increase of 400% would mean there would now be 1,440 sex workers on Auckland's streets. The Committee considers that the research undertaken by the CSOM conclusively refutes an increase of this magnitude, with the 2007 figures estimating the number of Auckland street-based sex workers at 230.

Furthermore, in relation to human trafficking, the PLRC (2008: 167) stated:

Information received from Immigration Service NZ indicates that no situations involving trafficking in the sex industry have been identified (Department of Labour, 2007).

=== Subsequent initiatives ===
Moves to restrict prostitution in New Zealand continue. In 2010, National MP Tau Henare called for restricting premises from being opened near schools. However this actually falls under local municipal responsibility. The Kiwi Party called for the repeal of the Act. The party's last remaining MP was voted out of Parliament in 2008, and it was subsequently absorbed into the Conservative Party of New Zealand. The party maintains the Kiwi Party's earlier opposition to prostitution law reform, but, like the Kiwi Party before it, polls well under the minimum threshold required for parliamentary list-only representation.

In May 2013, Elizabeth Subritzky submitted a petition on behalf of Freedom from Sexual Exploitation that asked the House of Representatives to "legislate for a national plan of action to combat street prostitution, including a law which makes the purchase of sexual services illegal" (the Swedish model). The Ministry of Justice responded to the assumptions in Petition 2011/60 in September 2013, followed by a response by the New Zealand Prostitutes Collective (NZPC) in February 2014. On 7 November 2014, the Justice and Electoral Committee of the New Zealand Parliament issued its report which rejected the petition. In its concluding comment, the committee stated: "We appreciate the petitioner's concerns about street prostitution. However, we are aware that the eradication of street-based prostitution has not proved to be achievable in any jurisdiction, and simply banning it may have negative consequences for the health and safety of sex workers. We support the Prostitution Law Review Committee's conclusion that local approaches are likely to be most effective in dealing with street prostitution." Reacting to the report, Dr Calum Bennachie from the New Zealand Prostitutes Collective stated that, "When other groups are finally given rights by society, they rarely have to keep returning to parliament to protect those rights. Yet, sex workers, who have been given their rights by Parliament in 2003 when sex work was decriminalised, continually have to defend themselves in parliament, fight the same battles, and time after time have to refute the same tired arguments based on invented figures."

== Today ==
As in other countries, New Zealand sex workers work in a variety of settings, including street prostitution and the indoor market in brothels and saunas, as well as for escort agencies and as independent workers.

=== Street prostitution ===
Street prostitution continues to dominate debates because of its visibility. For instance, sex workers often gather on and around Karangahape Road and Hunter's Corner in Auckland, Cuba/Vivian/Marion Streets in Wellington, and Manchester Street in Christchurch amongst other places. Since the 22 February 2011 earthquake in Christchurch this has moved to Ferry Road and the residential end of Manchester Street.

Despite it being illegal (see Attorney General's opinion on the New Zealand Bill of Rights) to discriminate against individuals on the basis of gender identity within New Zealand, the transgender community often finds that many of its younger members require survival sex for food, shelter and rest. As such, they are heavily represented within street sex work.

Conflicts in the South Auckland area of Manukau continue to be the focus of debate (see below).

=== Brothels and escort agencies ===
Many sex workers find employment in brothels or escort agencies. In the brothels, clients come to the place of business, which may be in a commercial area and fairly obvious, sometimes attached to a strip club, or more discreetly in a residential area. Escort agencies take phone calls from clients and arrange for the worker to go to their homes or motels. Typically the business will charge the worker a fee per shift, and will usually also take a set percentage of the client's fee. It is illegal for brothel operators to fine workers for lateness, unprofessional conduct and other misdemeanours, but many legally charge what they call 'shift fees', and most require their workers to buy their own clothes and accessories. This means that on a slow night the worker may actually lose money. However, brothels and escort agencies are generally seen as preferable to street prostitution, as their environment appears to be relatively safe. Brothels vary in size between 3 sex workers on duty to up to approximately 30. Brothels and agencies advertise through a range of media, including billboards, the Internet, and late night television advertisements, but especially newspaper advertisements, particularly in New Zealand Truth until its closure in 2013.

One of the results of the law change is that 16- and 17-year-old sex workers are no longer allowed to work in brothels. With the exception of several well publicised cases this change has been successful.

Sex workers who do not wish to be employed often set up one-person or two-person brothels or agencies, commonly in their homes. Within the definitions of the act these are called small owner operated brothels (SOOBs). They tend to rely on classified newspaper advertisements or by advertising on the Internet.

The location of brothels within local territories has been a continuing area of litigation, and a poll conducted in March 2011 suggested that 66% of the population would support a ban on brothels in residential areas. The same poll showed a 50% support for banning street prostitution.

This poll published by NZ Herald was initially commissioned by the political conservative Christian group Family First and run by Curia Market Research. The research has drawn criticism as potentially representing bias due to the ties to Family First. Potential areas of result skew include:

- An unusually high proportion of respondents from more conservative rural areas. 31% of respondents versus 8.4% population distribution. (Source: see table one)
- Age distributions not reflective of the general population instead favouring older more conservative age groups (although the overall effect of this is unknown as approval and disapproval varied significantly throughout age groups without clear trend towards changing attitudes with age).
- Respondents were 57% female and 43% male while population distributions show females as 51% of the population. This may have had significant effect as females were found to be more substantially more likely to disapprove of prostitution (For females 44% to 64% approve regulation, while in males 28% to 39% approve).

=== Conflict – the case of Manukau (Auckland) ===
Manukau City in South Auckland consistently opposed the legislation. Manukau felt that street prostitution was particularly problematic in its area. Manukau City Council's portfolio leader for community safety, Councillor Dick Quax, was particularly critical. In 2009, he said that "involvement of gangs and organised crime in street prostitution has become evident (...) Street prostitution also attracts offensive litter, disorder, drugs, and intimidation", and "There are kids going to school with condoms lying on the street and prostitutes still standing around. It's dangerous, not only for the workers themselves, but for the rest of the community. We're sick of it (...) The community has had enough. It's not fun to come out in the morning and be having to clean up condoms lying in your garden and on the fence. Cleaning up condoms and needles – it's just not fair."

This has led to conflicts with the locals, which have attempted to curb this phenomenon, by trying to scare off prostitutes' customers, breaking negotiations between prostitutes and clients, and sending the prostitutes' clients letters, tracking them down through their car registration plates.

A private Bill, the Manukau City Council (Control of Street Prostitution) Bill 2005, led to hearings before a select committee, but failed to pass its second parliamentary reading on 11 October 2006 (46 votes to 73) following a Select Committee Report that stated that, "initiatives supported by the local community, sex workers and their advocates, outreach workers, social agencies, and the police are a more effective and appropriate use of resources than the proposed legislated solution". A government review of the situation was carried out in 2009, and concluded no further special legislative action was required. This resulted in critics of the legislation to be dissatisfied. Councillor Quax said that the review was very disappointing: "It ignores the fact that anti-social behaviour such as harassment and intimidation has become worse since the passing of the legislation decriminalising prostitution."

Manukau then made a further attempt to regulate prostitution with the Manukau City Council (Regulation of Prostitution in Specified Places) Bill 197-1 (2010). This passed first reading 82 votes to 36 in a conscience vote on 8 September 2010. The Bill was opposed by the Māori Party. The Bill's purpose is stated as "This Bill provides for local bylaw control over the locations where the business of prostitution or commercial sexual services may occur when that business or those services take place or are conducted other than in a brothel or a small owner-operated brothel in Manukau City" and was referred to the Local Government and Environment Select Committee, which required submissions by 5 November. all of which have been posted on-line.

The future of the Bill was placed in doubt when Manukau City Council ceased to exist in late 2010, being absorbed into the Auckland Council. However, the new Auckland Council endorsed the bill and in view of the municipal reorganisation Auckland was given till February 2011 to present its submission, the Committee hoping to report to parliament in March 2011, enabling a second reading of the bill. The Auckland Council asked the NZPC to make a presentation to it on 15 February 2011. On 27 January 2011, Council voted 11 to 7 to support a submission to the committee on the bill, in order to give them powers to prohibit street prostitution anywhere in Auckland.

However, in late June 2011, retiring Manurewa New Zealand Labour Party MP George Hawkins conceded that his private members bill had insufficient parliamentary support to pass its second reading, now scheduled for September 2011, and said that the perceived "radical" expansion of the bill to encompass the whole of Auckland City would adversely affect any subsequent passage. Other objections are local exemptions to national ambit legislation, and criticism from law enforcement and social service agencies that provide front-line health and social services to street sex workers. It was also seen as contravening the Bill of Rights. Despite such objections, local Papatoetoe businesses hope to invest in more closed-circuit television surveillance cameras to deal with what they view as "anti-social" and "public nuisance" behaviour allegedly ancillary to street sex work. Supporters of the sex workers argue that the behaviour in question may be unrelated to their presence, and linked to the early closure of public toilets and widespread alcohol outlets within the adjacent area.

The private member's bill was later reintroduced to Parliament, with strong criticism from some members of the LGBT community. They argued that the bill would disproportionately affect transgender street sex workers, given that gender identity is not covered within New Zealand's Human Rights Act 1993. They also argued that the Manukau and Auckland City Council had contributed to the situation through closure of public toilets and denial of the use of council rental accommodation to sex workers, and denounced what is argued to be vigilante tactics from some anti-sexworker local residents. They argued that in instances of inappropriate sex worker behaviour, local councils, concerned residents, police, and business interests should rely on the Summary Offences Act 1981. Furthermore, the council is stated to have exaggerated the number of street sex workers.

The Local Government and Environment Committee reported back to Parliament on the Manukau City Council (Regulation of Prostitution in Specified Places) Bill on 5 December 2014 and recommended that it not be passed. The Bill received its final vote on 25 February 2015 and was defeated 109–11, with only New Zealand First voting for the bill.

Whether or not this means that there will be a third private members bill to re-criminalize street sex work, despite this second consecutive defeat, is uncertain. Defeated former New Zealand First List MP Asenati Lole-Taylor was an advocate of such tactics, but she was too low down on her party list rankings to return to Parliament after the 2014 New Zealand general election. For her party, New Zealand First Deputy Leader Tracey Martin spoke in support of the bill's passage during its second parliamentary reading and consequent defeat.

=== Prostitution and minors ===
Underage involvement in the sex industry continues to be a controversial issue in New Zealand, both before and after the passage of the PRA in 2003, with conflicting claims of its extent or relationship to the PRA.

==== The law ====
Child prostitution is illegal. The Prostitution Reform Act 2003 reads as follows:

Prohibitions on use in prostitution of persons under 18 years
20. No person may cause, assist, facilitate, or encourage a person under 18 years of age to provide commercial sexual services to any person.
21. No person may receive a payment or other reward that he or she knows, or ought reasonably to know, is derived, directly or indirectly, from commercial sexual services provided by a person under 18 years of age.
22. No person may contract for commercial sexual services from, or be client of, person under 18 years
(1) No person may enter into a contract or other arrangement under which a person under 18 years of age is to provide commercial sexual services to or for that person or another person.
(2) No person may receive commercial sexual services from a person under 18 years of age.
23. Every person who contravenes section 20, section 21, or section 22 commits an offense and is liable on conviction on indictment to imprisonment for a term not exceeding 7 years.
(2) No person contravenes section 20 merely by providing legal advice, counselling, health advice, or any medical services to a person under 18 years of age.
(3) No person under 18 years of age may be charged as a party to an offense committed on or with that person against this section.

Thus, it is legal for a person under 18 to be a sex worker, but it is illegal for anyone else to profit from them in this capacity, or cause, assist, facilitate, or encourage them to provide commercial sexual services to any person. It is also illegal for anyone to purchase sex from a person aged under 18. The media are likely to require photographic ID before placing advertisements to ensure they are complying with this law. The defence of "reasonableness" has been removed, but sex workers appearing under age may be asked by police to provide proof of age.

There is no explicit minimum age to be a client of a prostitute. Therefore, it is presumed the minimum age is 16, the legal age of consent in New Zealand.

==== Media publicity ====
Newspapers report on concerns about underage street workers, stating that this is the commonest entry point into the trade for them and that some of them may be being pimped by gang members.

Reports have cited some community workers who stated that they had found girls "as young as 10 or 11" selling sex, and one mentioned students from a West Auckland high school who "turned tricks" at lunchtime. Children as young as 13 were also removed from the streets of South Auckland.

Convictions have been obtained against operators who did not check ID and hired under age workers. There have been several cases in Christchurch. Another case occurred in Whangārei.

In 2005, ECPAT New Zealand and the Stop Demand Foundation (agencies which combat the sexual exploitation of children), commenting on the Ministry of Justice's report "The Nature and Extent of the Sex Industry in New Zealand", questioned the effectiveness of New Zealand's legislation in relation to underage prostitution; the agencies pointed to a police survey of the New Zealand sex industry which showed that 210 children under the age of 18 years were identified as selling sex, with three-quarters being concentrated in one Police District.

In Christchurch in 2008, Salvation Army officer Major Wendy Barney from Christchurch's Street Outreach Service (SOS) said underage prostitution was "a big problem – but also a hidden one". Nevertheless, this anecdotal evidence is not supported by statement made by outreach workers from youth support agencies, including Youth and Cultural Development (YCD), who indicate that many of the young people are not working, but are "hanging out" on the streets.

Despite these claims, police have continued to bring prosecutions for underage prostitution against the brothels despite relaxed oversight.

==== US Human Rights Reports ====
The United States Department of State Human Rights Reports from 2004–2009 comment on child prostitution cases in New Zealand. The 2008 report states that prosecutors in Christchurch applied for the first time the law banning sexual slavery, adopted in 2006 in accordance with the UN Convention on the Rights of the Child. However this is not mentioned in domestic sources, and the PRA provides penalties for such actions; and the 2009 report does not mention it.

The NZ government has criticised the US reports as being based on faulty and biased data sets. For example, it appears that the State Department ignored material in the Prostitution Law Review Committee Report, which indicated there was no evidence of increased underage sex work in the New Zealand sex industry. This latter report is acknowledged in the 2009 US report.

== Support and services for sex workers ==
The New Zealand Prostitutes' Collective (NZPC) is a New Zealand-based organisation that supports the rights of sex workers and educates prostitutes about minimising the risks of the job. It was founded in 1987 by, among others, Catherine Healy, and received funding from the Minister of Health in 1988, and subsequently the Department of Health (which became the Ministry of Health). The organisation played a major part in the decriminalisation of prostitution.

== Further information from evaluation process ==
The report "The Impact of the Prostitution Reform Act on the Health and Safety Practices of Sex Workers: Report to the Prostitution Law Review Committee" from the Christchurch School of Medicine was a study of 772 sex workers in New Zealand, covering Auckland, Wellington and Christchurch as main urban centres, and Nelson and the Hawkes Bay as secondary centres. It and studies by the Crime and Justice Research Centre at Victoria University provided the Prostitution Law Review Committee with the evidence that it required to reach a conclusion about the effect of the Prostitution Reform Act 2003 on sex workers.

The researchers described this process further in a 2010 book titled "Taking the crime out of sex work- New Zealand sex workers' fight for decriminalisation". It was written by Gillian Abel (a senior public health researcher and lecturer at the University of Otago, New Zealand), Lisa Fitzgerald (a public health sociologist and social science lecturer in the School of Population Health, University of Queensland), and Catherine Healy (a founding member of the New Zealand Prostitutes' Collective). The book includes the results of interviews with over 700 sex workers, and concludes that the decriminalisation has had positive effects for the prostitutes' safety and health.

In its 2008 "Report of the Prostitution Law Review Committee on the Operation of the Prostitution Reform Act 2003", the committee provided further information on many of the cases and background of sex work in New Zealand. The Report also addressed issues raised by ECPAT New Zealand and the Stop Demand Foundation, and the claims made by those supporting the Manukau City Council (Control of Street Prostitution) Bill 2005.

== Bibliography ==
Books

- Abel, G., Fitzgerald, L., & Healy, C., (2010). Taking the crime out of sex work: New Zealand sex workers' fight for decriminalisation. Bristol: Policy Press.(Decriminalisation of sex industry positive move)
- Jordan, J (1991) Working Girls: Women in the New Zealand Sex Industry, Penguin
  - History
    - Belich, James (1996) Making Peoples: A history of the New Zealanders from Polynesian settlement to the end of the nineteenth century, Allen Lane, Auckland
    - Philippa Levine (2003) Prostitution, Race, and Politics: Policing Venereal Disease in the British Empire, Routledge ISBN 0-415-94447-3, ISBN 978-0-415-94447-2
  - Book chapters
    - Lichtenstein, B: Reframing "Eve" in the AIDS era, in Sex Work and Sex Workers, BM Dank and R Refinetti eds. Transaction, New Brunswick NJ 1998

Articles

- Macfarlane, D: Transsexual prostitution in New Zealand: Predominance of persons of Maori extraction, Arch Sex Behav 13(4): 301, 1984
- Jan Jordan: Sex, law and social control – the sex industry in New Zealand today. Australian Institute of Criminology 1991
- Jody Hanson, Learning to be a prostitute: Education and training in the New Zealand Sex industry, Women's Studies Journal, 12(2): 77–85, 1996
- Bronwen Lichtenstein, Tradition and experiment in New Zealand AIDS policy, AIDS and Public Policy, 12 (3): 79–88, 1997
- Kathleen Potter, Judy Martin, Sarah Romans: Early developmental experiences of female sex workers: a comparative study. Australian and New Zealand Journal of Psychiatry |volume=33 |issue=6 December 1999, 935 – 940
- Plumridge L, Abel G. Services and information utilised by female sex workers for sexual and physical safety. N Z Med J. 2000 Sep 8;113(1117):370–2.
- Sarah E. Romans, Kathleen Potter, Judy Martin, Peter Herbison: The mental and physical health of female sex workers: a comparative study. Australian and New Zealand Journal of Psychiatry Volume 35 Issue 1, 2001, Pages 75 – 80
- Libby Plumridge, Gillian Abel: A 'segmented' sex industry in New Zealand: sexual and personal safety of female sex workers. Australian and New Zealand Journal of Public Health Volume 25 Issue 1, 2001, Pages 78 – 83
- Martin S. Weinberg, Heather Worth and Colin J. Williams: Men Sex Workers and Other Men Who Have Sex With Men: How Do Their HIV Risks Compare in New Zealand? Archives of Sexual Behavior Volume 30, Number 3 / June 2001, 273
- Patt, Prof. Martin. Child Prostitution – New Zealand. The Commercial Sexual Exploitation of Children in the first ten years of the 21st Century – 2000 to 2009 Archived 9 October 2010 at the Wayback Machine
- Radačić, Ivana (9 May 2017). "New Zealand Prostitutes' Collective—An Example of a Successful Policy Actor". Social Sciences. 6 (2): 46. doi:10.3390/socsci6020046.
  - History
    - Macdonald, C., "The Social Evil: Prostitution & the Passage of the Contagious Diseases Act (1869)" in Brookes B, Macdonald C. and Tennant M. (eds), Women in History: Essays on European Women in New Zealand (Allen Unwin, Wellington, 1986).
    - Dalley, B: 'Fresh Attractions': White slavery and feminism in New Zealand, 1885–1918, Women's History Review 9(3): 585–606, 2000

Theses

- Heidi Whiteside, 'We shall be Respectable': Women and representations of respectability in Lyttelton 1851–1893, MA University of Canterbury 2007
- Kehoe, Jean. Medicine, sexuality and imperialism : British medical discourses surrounding venereal disease in New Zealand and Japan : a socio-historical and comparative study PhD Thesis Victoria University of Wellington, 1992
- Lucas, Heather, ‘"Square Girls": Prostitutes and Prostitution in Dunedin in the 1880s', BA (Hons), University of Otago, 1985.

Media

- Paul Litterick: The Open Society, Winter 2004 77(2):7 Archived 3 March 2009 at the Wayback Machine

Parliamentary documents

- Prostitution Reform Bill 2000
  - Debates
    - Tim Barnett (Labour): First reading speech (11 October 2000) (archived)
    - Sue Bradford (Green): First reading speech (8 November 2000)
    - Second reading debate and vote (19 February 2003)
    - Tim Barnett (Labour): Second reading speech
    - Third reading debate and vote (25 June 2003)
    - Sue Bradford (Green): Third reading speech (25 June 2003)
  - Submissions
    - Public Health Association of New Zealand: Policy on Decriminalisation of Prostitution (2001) Archived 3 March 2009 at the Wayback Machine
    - Public Health Association of New Zealand: Submission on the Prostitution Reform Bill (2001)
    - New Zealand Law Society submission (2001)
    - Human Rights Commission submission (2001)
    - Human Rights CommissionSupplement (2001)
    - CATW-A submission (2001)
    - Wellington Rape Crisis submission (2002)
  - Reports
    - Report of Justice and Electoral Committee (November 2002)
  - Legislation and regulations
    - Prostitution Reform Act 2003 Archived 26 April 2023 at the Wayback Machine
    - Regulations: Warrants Archived 15 March 2009 at the Wayback Machine
    - Regulations: Certificates
    - A Guide to Occupational Health and Safety

Government documents

- NEW ZEALAND'S NATIONAL PLAN OF ACTION AGAINST THE COMMERCIAL SEXUAL EXPLOITATION OF CHILDREN. Ministry of Justice 2002
- Child prostitution. Ministry of Justice 2003 (archived)
- Persons under 18 years of age Ministry of Justice 2007
- Parliamentary Research Papers: Prostitution law reform in New Zealand. July 2012 Archived 13 July 2015 at the Wayback Machine

Political statements

- Green Party
  - Sue Bradford: Sex workers deserve the protection of the law (30 July 2001)
- Labour
  - BBC: Interview with Prime Minister Helen Clark (11 July 2003) Archived 15 February 2009 at the Wayback Machine
  - Tim Barnett: Prostitution Law Reform 2005
  - Tim Barnett: What did it change, and what has happened since? (August 2006) (archived)
  - Tim Barnett: The campaign and the outcome (January 2007) (archived)
  - Tim Barnett: Reform of prostitution law a success (23 May 2008) (archived)
- Future New Zealand
  - Gordon Copeland: Swedish prostitution law model for New Zealand (19 November 2007)
- Local government
  - Local Government New Zealand response (14 July 2003)
  - Local Government New Zealand background document
    - Auckland
      - Submission by Sue Bradford and Tim Barnett (25 November 2003)
      - High Court Decision 14 March 2006
      - Response by Sue Bradford (15 March 2006)
    - Manukau
      - Manukau City Council (Control of Street Prostitution) Bill 2005
      - Law Society Submission 2006
      - Committee Report (September 2006)
    - Carterton
      - Prostitution by-law 2007 Archived 3 March 2009 at the Wayback Machine
    - Christchurch
      - Christchurch Brothel by-law 2004 Archived 15 October 2008 at the Wayback Machine
      - Greens response to decision to abandon appeal of High Court decision (23 March 2006)
    - Hamilton
      - Prostitution by-law 2004 (archived)
      - TVNZ By-law upheld 20 July 2006
      - Court of Appeal decision (28 November 2007) Archived 14 May 2015 at the Wayback Machine
      - Hamilton City Council: Press release (28 November 2007)(archived)
      - Infonews: By-law to be reviewed (September 2008) Archived 15 March 2009 at the Wayback Machine
