= NZPC =

The initials NZPC can refer to several things, usually associated with New Zealand, including:

- New Zealand Performance Car magazine
- New Zealand Poker Championship
- New Zealand Press Council
- New Zealand Prostitutes' Collective
- Noordwijkse Zwem en Polo Club, Netherlands
