= Catherine Healy (activist) =

New Zealand activist

Dame Catherine Healy DNZM
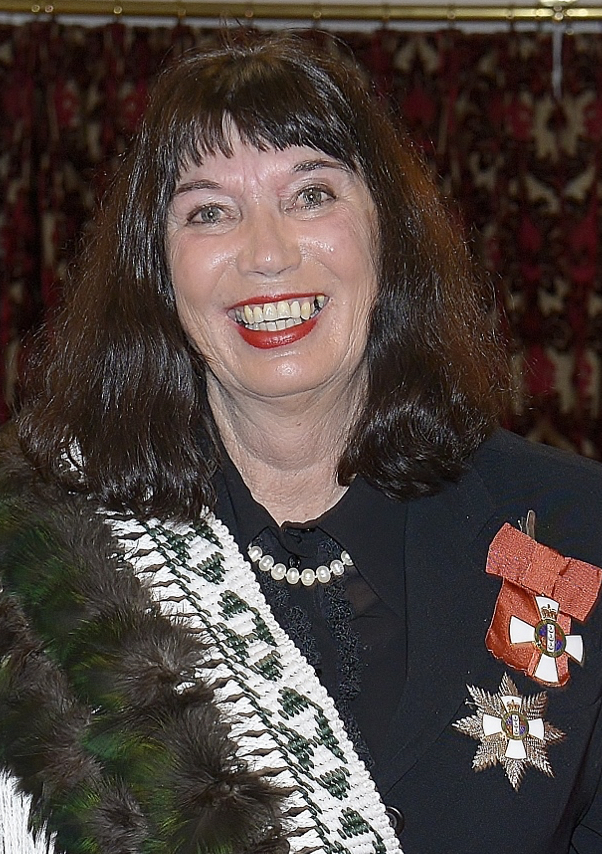
- Healy in 2018
- Born: 1956 (age 69–70); New Zealand
- Occupation: Activist
- Known for: Sex workers' rights activism

Dame Catherine Alice Healy DNZM (born 1956) is a New Zealand sex workers' rights activist, field researcher and former sex worker. She worked for the decriminalisation of prostitution and works generally for the improvement of the sex work profession. She is the national coordinator and a founding member of the New Zealand Prostitutes' Collective (NZPC).

== Early life ==
Born in 1956, Healy grew up near Eastbourne, with three siblings and "liberal-minded" parents. As a child she was involved in the anti-apartheid and anti-tour movements, and frequently attended marches and rallies. Her father died when she was 15 years old, making her last few years of high school particularly difficult. Healy went on to attend teachers' college, and build her early career as a primary school teacher. She now lives with her partner of 30 years in her childhood home.

== Career ==
Healy worked as a primary school teacher in Wellington for nine years in the late 1970s and early 1980s. Healy graduated from Wellington Teachers College, Victoria University Wellington, in December, 1976. She was first introduced to sex work through her then flatmate, who revealed herself to be a sex worker. Although at first horrified, she once accompanied her flatmate on a night out, and eventually took home one of her clients. At that time, she decided that sex work was not for her, and continued teaching. Despite this initial disinterest, in 1986 Healy answered an ad to work in a massage parlour to supplement her primary school wages. After a year's absence from teaching, she decided to fully commit to her job as a sex worker. She began working in brothels, namely what is now the General Practitioner bar on Willis St.

She reportedly received $2000 a month as a sex worker, compared to her salary of $400 as an educator, which she was able to spend on her frequent trips and adventures abroad. She worked for seven years as a sex worker, until eventually turning her focus towards advocacy for the protection of sex workers and decriminalisation of sex work.

The New Zealand Prostitutes' Collective (NZPC), now called the New Zealand Sex Workers' Collective, was established in October 1987 to organise sex workers in this movement for protection and decriminalisation. Healy and her fellow members of the NZPC initiated this campaign for decriminalisation of sex work. Sex work was finally decriminalised in New Zealand in 2003 after the implementation of the Prostitution Reform Act 2003; Healy was in the public gallery to witness the final vote.

Healy and NZPC agreed to be in a television documentary directed by Clare O'Leary and produced by Vincent Burke, with the title A Double Standard. The documentary explored the views of New Zealand sex workers and NZPC concerning why sex work needed to be removed from The Crimes Act 1961 and how sex work decriminalisation would improve public health outcomes and sex workers' safety.

On 24 February 2010, Healy was invited by the Oxford Union at the University of Oxford to debate whether sex work should be decriminalised. She became the second New Zealander after David Lange to be invited to debate at the university. At the university, she argued for decriminalisation of sex work and won the debate.

Healy has membership of various boards and committees. She has been invited as a speaker at the House of Commons of the United Kingdom and acts as an advisory on issues and policy formulations related to prostitution. The Prostitution Law Review Committee, a committee established by the New Zealand government, had Healy as one of its members. She has worked as a field researcher and has been involved with multiple research undertakings. She also works as a consultant for sex workers of all genders, brothel owners and other persons involved in prostitution.

With Gillian Abel and Lisa Fitzgerald, Healy has co-edited the book Taking the Crime Out of Sex Work: New Zealand Sex Workers' Fight for Decriminalisation. The book argues decriminalisation has resulted in better working conditions for prostitutes. She lives in Eastbourne.

== Honours ==
Healy was awarded the New Zealand Suffrage Centennial Medal in 1993. In the 2018 Queen's Birthday Honours, she was appointed a Dame Companion of the New Zealand Order of Merit, for services to the rights of sex workers.

== See also ==
- Prostitution in New Zealand
