= New Zealand Prostitutes' Collective =

Sex workers' organization

- Formation: 1987
- Purpose: Advocate for the rights, safety, health, and well-being of all sex workers. Provide information and services for people who are doing sex work or thinking about doing sex work.
- Website: www.nzpc.org.nz

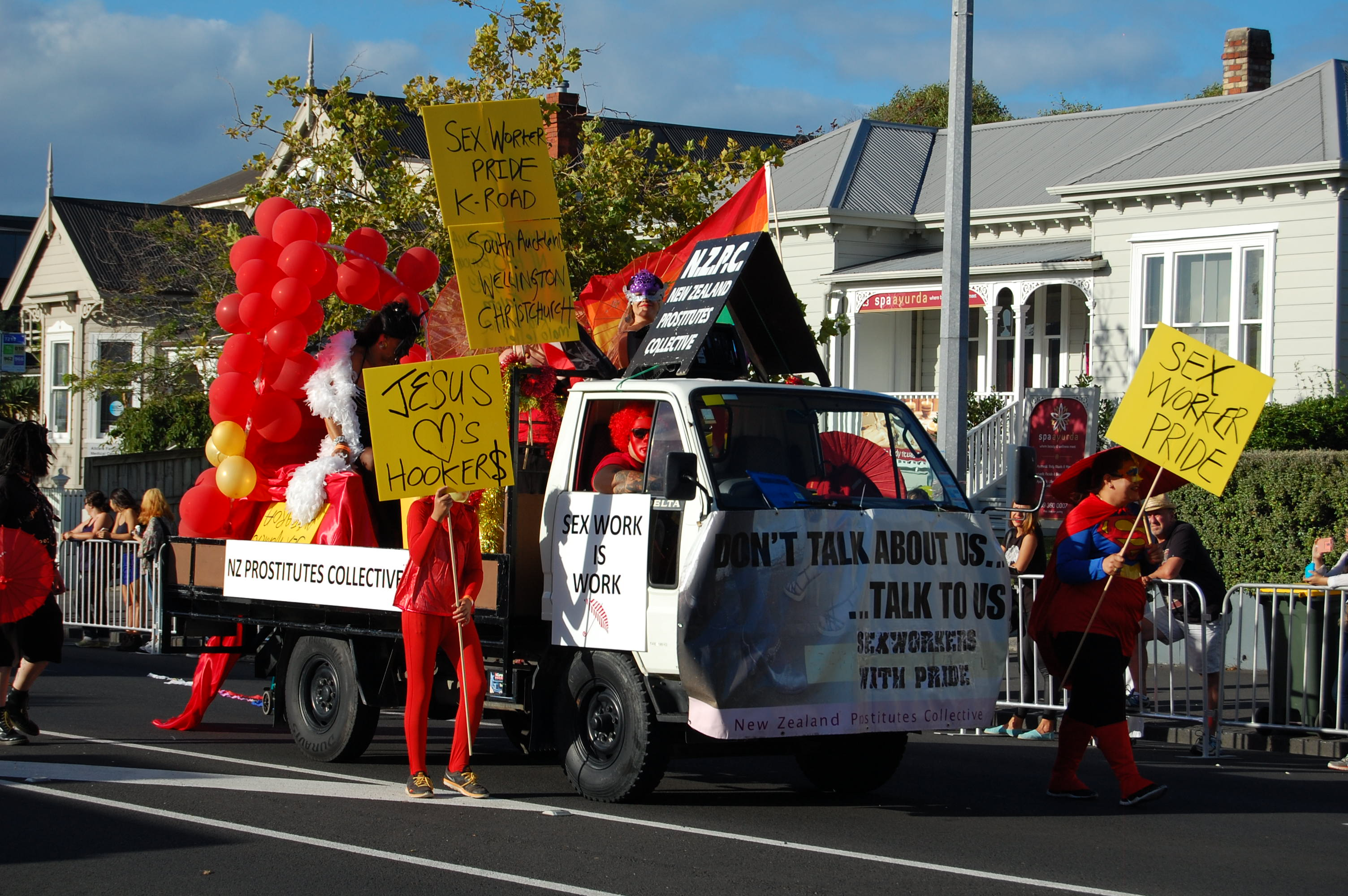
New Zealand Prostitutes' Collective on Auckland pride parade in 2016

The Aotearoa New Zealand Sex Workers' Collective (NZPC), formerly the New Zealand Prostitutes' Collective, is a New Zealand-based organisation that supports sex workers' rights and educates sex workers about minimising the risks of the job.

== Background ==
The New Zealand Prostitutes' Collective was founded in 1987 by Catherine Healy and others. Funding was received from a contract in 1988 for HIV/AIDS prevention from the Department of Health. Offices were established in Auckland, Wellington, and Dunedin, and a phone support service operated for Christchurch. These were all mostly run by approximately 40 volunteers, as the Collective had only 1.5 staff members. Advocacy was a big part of the work of the Collective, and they promoted legislative reform of the Crimes Bill which contained a legal double standard, which censured the prostitute, while condoning the client. The first submission they made to this bill was in 1989. They continued to play an active role in the New Zealand Labour Party-led Helen Clark administration passing the Prostitution Reform Act 2003, which decriminalised most forms of adult prostitution in New Zealand. The Prostitution Law Review Committee published in their final report in 2008 that there was no increase in prostitution, and that sex workers were safer.

During the early 1990s, the New Zealand Prostitutes' Collective faced significant opposition due to the stigma of sex work and attention around the legislative reform. An example described by Jan Jordan is: "Even the supposedly simple task of having their phone number listed in the telephone directory had been a battle, with Telecom objecting to having the word 'prostitutes' printed in their phone book."

In 1994, a television documentary directed by Clare O'Leary entitled "A Double Standard", was produced to demonstrate the then current problems that the criminalization of sex workers under The Massage Parlour Act 1978 could and were causing before the Prostitution Reform Act 2003 was passed and enacted on 25 June, 2003. Any person committing an offence under the Massage Parlour Act 1978, upon conviction could be issued with a fine not exceeding NZ$200.

== Current ==
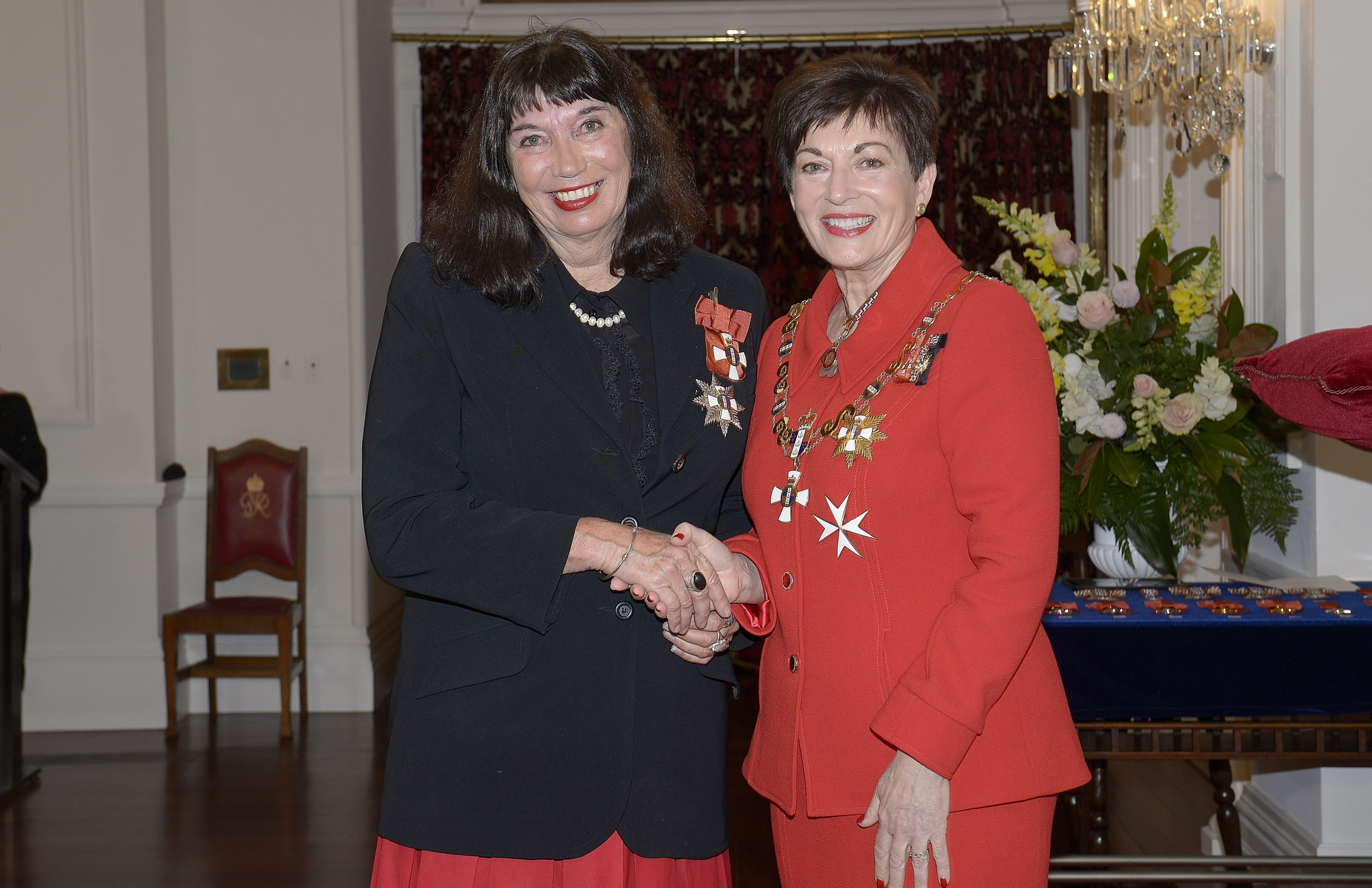
Catherine Healy receiving her damehood in 2018

By 2018, the Collective employed more people, as well as using volunteers. Part of the success of NZPC is that it is staffed by sex workers; there are only two staff members who are not sex workers – a lawyer, and an accountant. There is a board of trustees, and they are all current or former sex workers. In 2018, NZPC founder Catherine Healy received a Dame Companion of the New Zealand Order of Merit, for services to the rights of sex workers, which is a turn-around in the acknowledgement and acceptance of sex work and the part that NZPC played in that.

NZPC receives funding from the Ministry of Health for sexual and reproductive health services. There are branches in Auckland, Tauranga, Manawatu, Hawkes Bay, Wellington, Christchurch, and Dunedin, and a helpline for other regions. A current advocacy focus is the discrimination faced by migrant sex workers in New Zealand because under the Prostitution Reform Act of 2003, migrant sex work is illegal. Ongoing outreach programs are run to support sex workers to be safe. In 2020, during New Zealand's strict level 4 lockdown, as a response to the global COVID-19 pandemic, the collective's Auckland manager Annah Pickering said: "Covid-19 hit sex workers particularly hard because of the nature of the job, and also because a big bulk of their clientele comes from overseas — many who book months in advance."

== See also ==
- Untold Intimacies
