= Decriminalization of sex work =

Removal of criminal penalties for sex work

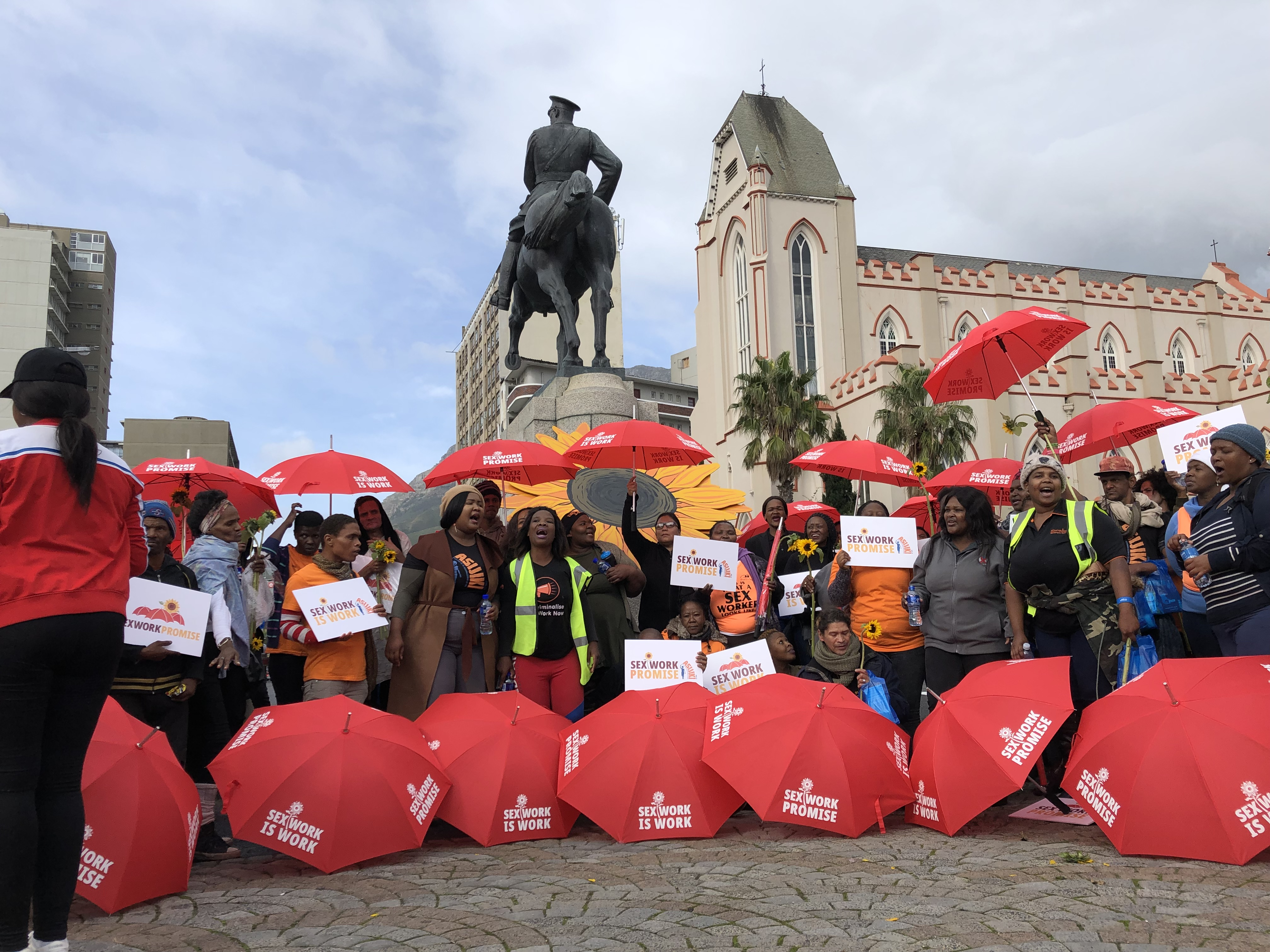
2019 Asijiki Coalition protest in front of the Parliament of South Africa holding red umbrellas and signs saying "sex work is work". They thanked President Cyril Ramaphosa for his efforts to decriminalise sex work.

Sex work, the consensual provision of sexual services for money or goods, is criminalized in most countries. Decriminalization is distinct from legalization (also known as the "regulationist" approach).

Advocates of decriminalization argue that removing the criminal sanctions surrounding sex work creates a safer environment for sex workers, and that it helps fight sex trafficking. Opponents of decriminalization argue that it will not prevent trafficking (or even increase trafficking) and could put sex workers at greater risk. Evidence from New Zealand, Belgium, and several Australian states, which have implemented this legal model) demonstrates that decriminalization is an evidence-based harm reduction approach.

Organizations including the Joint United Nations Programme on HIV/AIDS (UNAIDS), the World Health Organization (WHO), Amnesty International, Human Rights Watch, United Nations Population Fund (UNFPA), and the medical journal The Lancet have called on countries to decriminalize sex work in the global effort to tackle the HIV/AIDS epidemic and ensure sex workers' access to health services. Almost all organisations run by sex workers themselves around the world favour the decriminalisation of sex work, and it tends to be their main goal. The Global Network of Sex Work Projects works with over 300 sex worker organisations in 110 countries, all of whom are united on the goal of full decriminalisation and workers' rights.

However, a European Parliament resolution adopted on 26 February 2014 regarding sexual exploitation and prostitution and its impact on gender equality states that "decriminalising the sex industry in general and making procuring legal is not a solution to keeping vulnerable women and under-age females safe from violence and exploitation, but has the opposite effect and puts them in danger of a higher level of violence, while at the same time encouraging prostitution markets – and thus the number of women and under-age females suffering abuse – to grow."

Two countries have fully decriminalized sex work, while one decriminalized it partially. In June 2003, New Zealand became the first country to decriminalize sex work, with the passage of the Prostitution Reform Act. The one remaining criminal law surrounding commercial sexual activities in New Zealand is a requirement to adopt safer sex practices, meaning condom usage is a legal standard. Despite decriminalisation, its sex industry is still controversial, with some issues remaining. In June 2022, Belgium became the first country in Europe and the second country in the world to decriminalize sex work. In 2024, Belgium added full workers' rights for sex workers, including access to maternity leave, sick pay, health insurance, pensions, and other benefits. In Australia, Queensland (2024), Victoria (2023), the Northern Territory (2019) and New South Wales (1995) have also decriminalised sex work.

== Legal models of sex work ==
Decriminalization – No criminal penalties for prostitution Legalization (regulation) – Prostitution legal and regulated Abolitionism – Prostitution is legal, but organized activities such as brothels and pimping are illegal; prostitution is not regulated Neo-abolitionism (Nordic model) – Illegal to buy sex and for 3rd party involvement, legal to sell sex Prohibitionism – Prostitution illegal in all aspects (selling and buying) Legality varies with local laws

There are a wide variety of legal approaches to regulating prostitution. NGOs, academics, and government agencies typically use five different models to organize the different approaches. Scholars have also used three-fold and four-fold classifications, and terminology may differ between studies. Some may equate the term "criminalisation" with "prohibition(ism)", while others regard all policies except "decriminalisation" as a certain degree of criminalisation.

=== Prohibitionism ===
Hindle et al. (2008) stated: "Prohibitionism seeks to eliminate prostitution by criminalizing all aspects of the prostitution trade. Under this approach, prostitution is seen as a violation of human dignity. Criminal law and effective law enforcement are viewed as critical tools in reducing the number of individuals involved in prostitution." Kulick (2003) stated that prohibitionist models "criminalise the actual transaction of selling sex." Scoular (2015) noted that those taking a prohibitionist approach believe that the sex trade is a violation of moral (usually religious) beliefs, and seek "to deter parties from engaging in prostitution by punishing one (usually the female sellers) or, increasingly, both parties."

=== Abolitionism ===
Hindle et al. (2008) stated: "Abolitionism is often described as the middle ground between prohibitionism and legalization. Advocates of this approach maintain that even though prostitutes may choose to enter the trade, it is nevertheless immoral. They believe that governments must take the necessary steps to allow prostitution to take place only as long as it does not infringe on public safety and order. Generally, abolitionists call for the criminalization of public solicitation." Kulick (2003) defined abolitionism as "a legal system that holds that prostitution in itself is not an offence, but the exploitation of the prostitution of others is; thus any third party recruiting, profiting from, or organising prostitutes is penalised."

=== Neo-abolitionism ===
Neo-abolitionism, also called the Nordic or Swedish model, is used in Sweden, Norway, France and other countries. While selling sex is not criminalized under this approach, the buying of sex is illegal. Neo-abolitionists claim these models do not punish prostitutes, but instead penalize those who purchase sex from sex workers. This model is criticized for causing sex workers to do their business in areas hidden from police and public, which often makes it more dangerous. Sex workers also note the harm that police themselves inflict is a primary concern through evictions, arrests, deportations, and sexual violence.

=== Legalization ===
Legalization is also referred to as "regulationism." In countries that legalize prostitution, some forms of prostitution are no longer prohibited, and there is legislation to control and regulate it. The legalization model has been adopted across the world, ranging from countries in Europe, parts of Australia, Latin America, and some areas of the United States. The extent and type of legislation varies from country to country and may be regulated by work permits, licensing or tolerance zones.However, there remain problematic aspects of the legalization model: while it can provide employment standards and protections, it also creates hierarchies between licensed and unlicensed workers. The legalization model has barriers of entry, making those who are marginalized, due to a variety of intersectional reasons, unable to obtain permits. This reflects a historical pattern where colonial governments restricted entry to immigrant women they believed were sex workers; colonial control and exclusion of various groups continue in this model. Today, under the legalization model, those who are not able to legally work in some countries, such as migrants, continue to be criminalized for sex work; they remain unprotected. Due to these shortcomings, the model is widely opposed by the sex workers' movement, instead advocating for the adoption of the decriminalization model.

=== Decriminalization ===
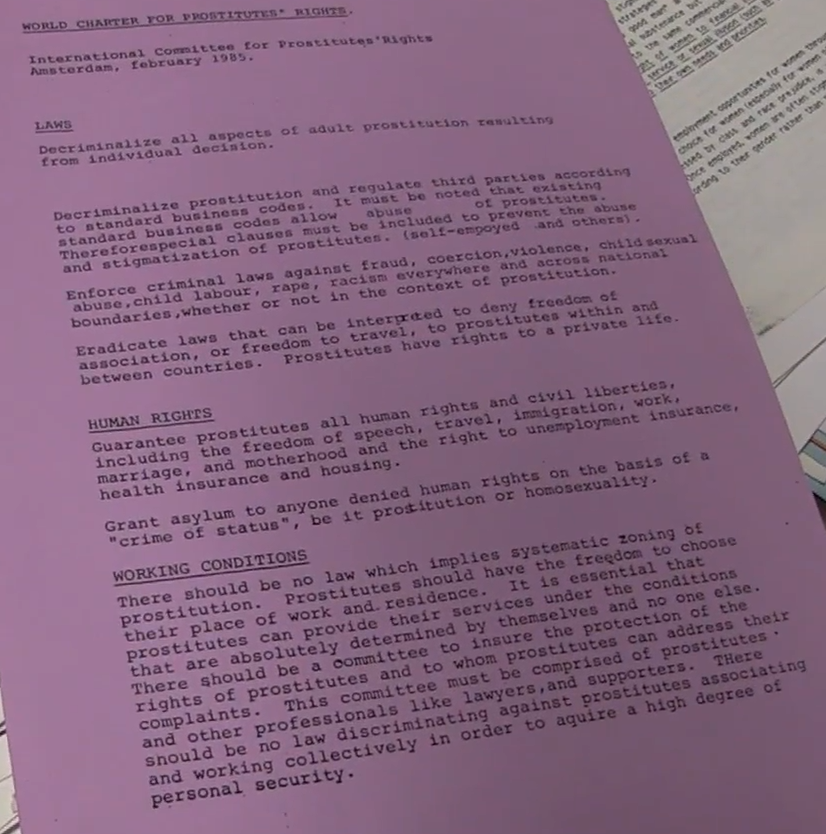
Page 1/2 of an original copy of the World Charter for Prostitutes' Rights (1985)

Decriminalization is the removal of criminal penalties for sex work. In countries that decriminalize sex work, sex workers receive the same protection and recognition as workers in other industries. The very first line of the World Charter for Prostitutes' Rights, written and adopted by the International Committee for Prostitutes' Rights on 15 February 1985 at the first World Whores Congress in Amsterdam, states: "Decriminalize all aspects of adult prostitution resulting from individual decision."

The World Health Organization (WHO) states that "modelling studies indicate that decriminalizing sex work could lead to a 46% reduction in new HIV infections in sex workers over 10 years".

== Effects of criminalization ==
=== Health ===
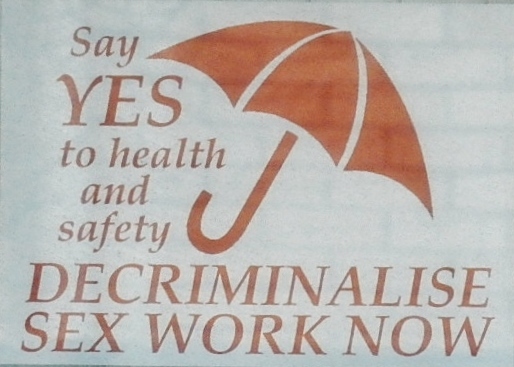
2015 window piece in Australia

According to the World Health Organization (WHO), sex workers are considered one of the key populations at risk for HIV infection, and sex workers who inject drugs are at even more risk due to unprotected sex, syringe sharing, alcohol or drug dependence, and violence. Stigma, poverty, and exclusion from legal social services have increased their vulnerability to HIV infection. Health risks and transmission of HIV as well as other sexually transmitted infections (STIs) are increased in incidences where condom usage and accessibility is limited or used to identify and criminalize sex workers. Many sex workers are managed by 'gatekeepers' who may be brothel owners, clients, or law enforcement figures, who often dictate condom usage. In Cambodia, a survey showed that 30% of sex workers who refused to put on condoms were sexually coerced. Fear of law enforcement and incarceration also discourages possession of condoms since they provide evidence for officers to prosecute and arrest. Evidence suggests that HIV risk can be sharply reduced when sex workers are able to negotiate safer sex. Decriminalization of sex work decreases the risk of HIV infection by breaking down stigma and increasing access to health services, reducing the risk of HIV/AIDS and STIs.

According to a 2020 study, criminalisation of sex work in one district in East Java, compared to neighbouring districts where sex work was not criminalised, increased the rate of sexually transmitted infections among female sex workers by 58%, made their income after leaving sex work lower on average, and their children more likely to begin working to supplement household income rather than go to school (as school expenses were harder to meet). A 2018 study found that the 2003–2009 decriminalization of indoor prostitution in Rhode Island led to reduced sexually transmitted infections (female gonorrhoea incidence declined by over 40%) and fewer rapes (reported rape offences fell by 30%). A 2017 study found that the introduction of legal prostitution zones in the Netherlands substantially reduced drug-related crime, sexual abuse and rape (the latter two by 30–40% in the first two years).

=== Violence ===
According to a 2021 study, the openings of strip clubs and escort services in New York City were associated with a 13% decrease in sex crime one week after the opening, while having no impact on other forms of crime. The evidence suggests that potential sex offenders frequent such establishments rather than commit sex crimes.

=== Discrimination and stigma ===
Sex workers experience significant stigma and discrimination as a result of criminalization. Though they consider sex work a legitimate income-generating activity, sex workers are viewed as immoral, deserving of punishment, and thus excluded from healthcare, education, and housing. Criminalization laws exclude sex workers from health systems that provide access to preventative care such as condoms and regular HIV or STI testing.

=== Human rights abuses ===
Sex workers, as a population that suffers disproportionately from HIV/AIDS, are often denied many human rights such as the right to freedom from discrimination, equality before the law, the right to life, and the right to the highest attainable standard of health. A study conducted in more than 11 countries by Sex Workers' Rights Advocacy Network (SWAN) concluded that more than 200 sex workers have experienced violence and discrimination. These acts of violence toward sex workers often include abuse, rape, kidnappings, and sexual violence. Sex workers also face extortion and unlawful arrests and detention, which profoundly impact their mental, physical, and social wellbeing. It is difficult for sex workers to seek criminal justice when it is reported that many police officers are partaking in the sexual and violent abuse. In North Macedonia, police sexual assault towards sex workers is particularly high: 82.4 percent of sex workers were assaulted by police in 2007. Criminalization also forces sex workers to work in unsafe settings to avoid police detection which increases their risk of being forced of coerced into sex trafficking. Criminalization laws such as bans on buying, solicitation, and the general organization of sex work perpetuate an unsafe environment for sex workers, provide impunity for abusers, and prevent sex workers from reporting the crime to the police.

=== Poverty ===
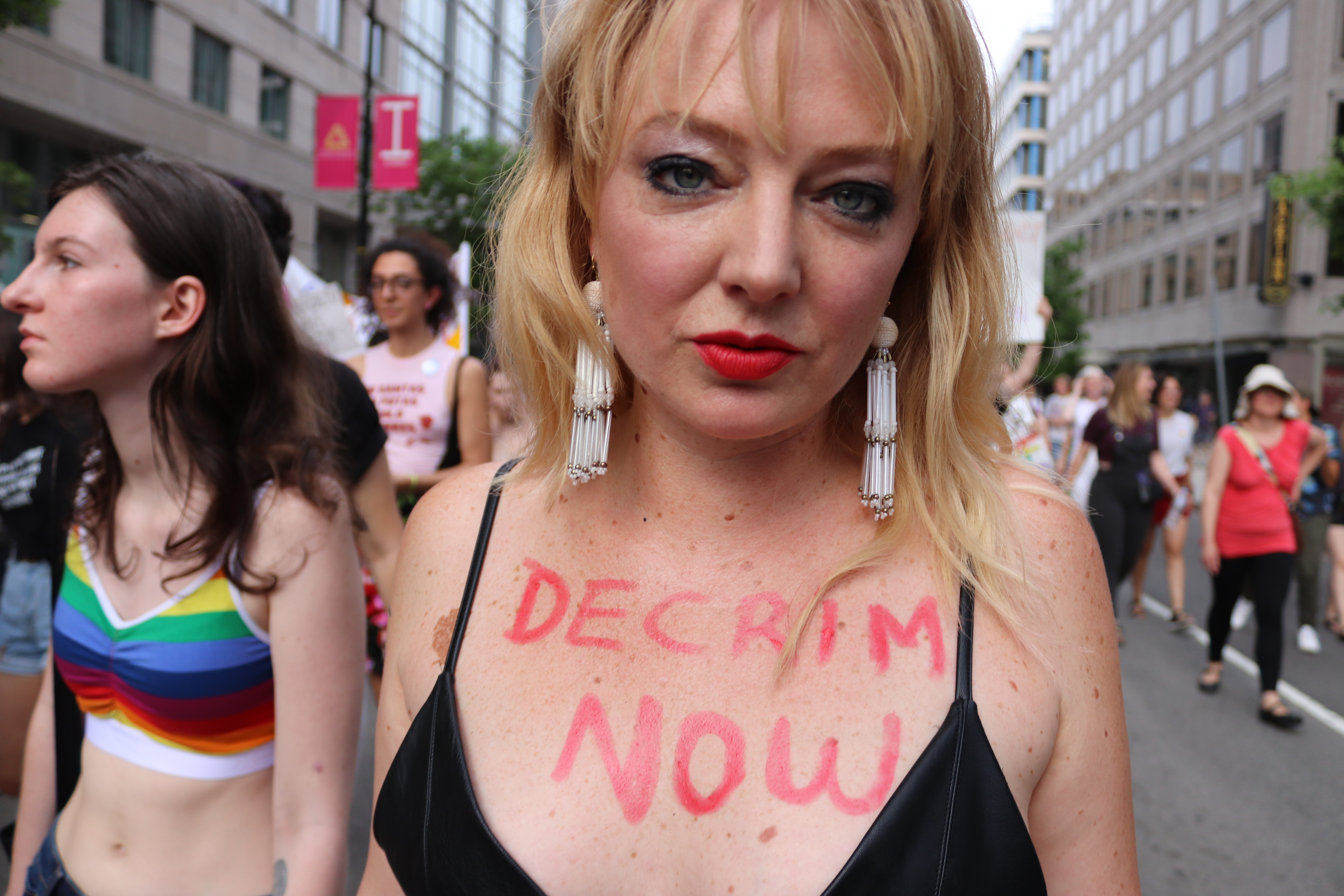
DC DYKE MARCH, Washington D.C., 2019

In countries where sex work is a crime, encounters with law enforcement and the judicial system can cause great financial difficulty for sex workers. Frequent arrests and legal fines may accumulate over time, and because a fair share of sex workers come from impoverished backgrounds anyway, the toll can be immense. In Washington, D.C., for example, a sex worker's first offense will result in a fine for as much as $500. The financial impact can then magnify over time after an encounter with law enforcement. Having a sex work offense on their record may complicate or completely prevent sex workers from acquiring housing. If a sex worker with a criminal record seeks employment in another industry, they may face discrimination or be disallowed from applying. 55% of Black trans sex workers who participated in a 2015 survey reported being unemployed, while 40% of trans sex workers had experienced gender discrimination when seeking employment.

== Specific populations ==
=== Male sex workers ===
Over the past several decades, the demand for male sex work has risen dramatically as people's opinions on both homosexuality and prostitution have begun to become more positive. As society's opinions on homosexuality and prostitution have changed in different parts of the world, there has been a subsequent push for the changing of the laws and regulations regarding these matters in some countries, which have helped to increase the demand for male sex work around the world.

The demand for the decriminalization of sex work has also increased. Organizations like the Sex Workers Project, the Sex Workers Outreach Project, the International Committee on the Rights of Sex Workers in Europe, the Asia Pacific Network of Sex Workers, and the African Sex Workers Alliance all work internationally to fight for the rights of both male and female sex workers and for the decriminalization of sex work as whole. This reflects how much the atmosphere surrounding the decriminalization of sex work has changed in the past several decades, as none of the organizations listed above existed before the 1990s.

Similarly to female sex work, there is a long history of discrimination against male sex work, but for different reasons. Much of the sentiment against male sex workers has come from its association with homosexuality, which for much of history was not socially acceptable. Much of this anti-homosexual sentiment stems from the fact that traditionally the three major Abrahamic religions (Judaism, Christianity, and Islam) taught that homosexuality was sinful, citing Leviticus 18:22: "You shall not lie with a male as with a woman; it is an abomination" as the main reasoning for this belief. As a result, homosexuality was made illegal in many societies, and often severe punishments were put in place for homosexual behavior.

Anti-homosexual sentiment still exists in some parts of the world. In some places, it is still illegal and punishable by death to be gay. For example, in countries like Yemen, Iran, Saudi Arabia, Mauritania, Nigeria, Brunei, Qatar, Pakistan, Sudan, United Arab Emirates, Somalia, and Afghanistan being homosexual is still punishable by death. In other countries, it is not punishable by death but is still illegal and is punishable in other ways. Punishment in these countries can range, 0–10 years, 10–life, and lashes/corporal punishment. Therefore, in many of these countries male sex workers work in unsafe conditions where they run a higher risk of experiencing violence, or sexual abuse to avoid detection by the police who are sometimes the proponents of this violence. Another issue associated with working in these unsafe conditions is the risk of contracting an STI or HIV is much higher.

There has been a push in the past several decades for the decriminalization of sex work in general and more specifically male sex work. The success of some of these movement in achieving the decriminalization and in some cases even legalization of sex work has increase the demand for male sex workers worldwide. Even in countries where neither legalization nor even full decriminalization has been achieved, these movements have at least been successful in relaxing the regulations regarding sex work in general and more specifically male sex work. Which as a result of the relaxing of these regulations even where unsuccessful in achieving full decriminalization, there has been a general increase in the demand for sex work and thereby male sex workers. The advent of the internet has also only worked to further increase the demand for male sex work as not only has it allowed male sex workers to connect with their clients more easily, but it has also allowed them to do so more discreetly, which is important in countries where prostitution is still illegal and for clients who want to keep their business private.

There are a number of organizations internationally who fight for the rights of sex workers and the decriminalization of prostitution which just to mention a few include the Sex Workers Project, the International Committee on the Rights of Sex Workers in Europe, and the African Sex Workers Alliance. These organizations serve as the leaders in the fight for the decriminalization of sex work as they use the power of their numbers to help them influence policy makes. Which leads to the argument for the decriminalization of male sex work. The argument for the decriminalization of male sex work shares many of the same key points as the arguments for the decriminalization of female sex work. With the main argument for the decriminalization of male sex work and sex work in general being that it is in the best interest of the public health to decriminalize sex work, to ensure that sex workers are capable of going through more professional channels to do their work. Allowing sex workers to use more professional channels in their work would allow them to more easily access protection, get tested for STIs and HIV, and enforce that their clients wear protection and be tested.

STIs and HIV are major issues in the field of male sex work, with some studies finding that up to 50% of male sex workers tested positive for HIV in some regions, many of whom were completely unaware. The rates of STIs and HIV amongst male sex workers varies wildly based on income level, race, and sexual preference. This a prime example of an area that would become more equitable to male sex workers of all income levels, races, and sexual preferences, if male sex and sex work in general were to be decriminalized and could only improve even further with full legalization. In general the rates of HIV were highest amongst male sex workers who identified as gay, and it is suggested that this may be partially the result of a lack of education regarding the need and importance of still using protection when engaging in gay sex. It has also been suggested that male sex workers may be unable to enforce that their clients use condoms due to the risk of experiencing violence for refusing to engage in condomless sex. These would both be less of an issue if male sex work and sex work in general were to be decriminalized, as it would allow them to go about their work in more professional settings that would greatly reduce the risk of them experiencing violence or contracting STIs and HIV.

=== Transgender sex workers ===
Transgender sex workers experience a disproportionate amount of discrimination and violence, and many activist groups advocate for decriminalization of sex work because it would greatly benefit transgender individuals in the industry. For example, the National Center for Transgender Equality expressed its support for the Amnesty International resolution in support of decriminalizing sex work on the basis of its goal to protect the human rights of workers in the sex industry.

One study of transgender sex workers that examined their reasons for involving themselves in the industry found that many transgender female sex workers experienced worry that they would not be hired by other employers because of their gender identity. Therefore, they sought work in the sex industry because they felt it was their only choice. However, many transgender female sex workers express satisfaction with their occupation because their clients approach them as "real females", and they experience less gender discrimination than they do in their daily lives. Many advocates view this sort of positive experience as evidence supporting the need to decriminalize sex work. In various qualitative studies, interviews with transgender female sex workers revealed their experience with policing and law enforcement, and numerous reported believing that their gender identity combined with their job in the sex industry resulted in discriminatory treatment from law enforcement, including verbal and physical abuse. The criminalization of sex work also imposes a unique risk to transgender sex workers because, if arrested and incarcerated, they experience highly disproportionate levels of physical and sexual violence at the hands of male prisoners in the facilities where they are required to be housed.

== Practical comparison ==
This section compares some examples of various legal models in practice.

=== Abolitionist practice ===
==== Brazil ====
Brazil operates within the abolitionist model of sex work. This means that selling sex in exchange for money is legal, and sex workers can even claim pensions and benefits when employed in the industry. However, it is illegal to employ sex workers or to profit off the work of a sex worker. In practice, this means that brothels and pimps are criminalized as is sex trafficking. Despite selling and buying sex being legal (only when occurring between sex workers and their clients), there are still many laws and regulations that limit those working in the sex industry. For example, sex workers in Brazil are often charged with vagrancy, loitering, or public disorder when law enforcement sees them soliciting clients. In Rio de Jainero specifically, legal authorities set up campaigns to dissuade sex tourism, and many individuals known to be promoting prostitution have been arrested.

=== Neo-abolitionist (Nordic) practice ===
==== Canada ====
In 2013, a study was conducted in Vancouver, where purchasing sex was enforced by the Vancouver Police Department as illegal but selling it was not. The study found that while the introduction of this policy did improve relations between sex workers and the police, it also "reproduce[d] the harms created by the criminalisation of sex work, in particular, vulnerability to violence and HIV/STIs".

Canada's prostitution law was challenged in 2013 by Terri-Jean Bedford, Amy Lebovitch, and Valerie Scott in the Bedford v. Canada case. The plaintiffs argued that the criminal laws disproportionately increased their risk of violence and victimization by preventing them from being able to employ safety strategies during the course of their work. In a 9–0 ruling, the Supreme Court of Canada determined that the communication provision, the bawdy house provision, and the living on the avails provision violated sex workers' rights to security of the persons. To give the Government of Canada time to respond, the declaration of invalidity was suspended for one year.

In 2014, the Government of Canada enacted the Protection of Communities and Exploited Persons Act (PCEPA). This legislation is modelled after the Nordic Model, and criminalizes buyers of sexual services as well as third-party supporters (brothel ownership and pimping are also illegal). Most Canadian sex workers' rights groups rejected the Nordic model, because it was deemed to be "harmful and inconsistent with sex workers' constitutional rights to health and safety", according to the Canadian Alliance for Sex Work Law Reform (CASWLR). Instead, they favoured New Zealand's model of decriminalisation, because it supposedly 'decreased violence against sex workers and increased police protection while improving employment conditions, including protection from harassment by the sex worker's employer'. In February 2020, an Ontario court judge struck down three parts of the PCEPA as unconstitutional: the prohibitions on advertising, procuring and materially benefiting from someone else's sexual services were violations of the 'freedom of expression' and 'security of the person' as defined in the Canadian Charter of Rights and Freedoms. If upheld, this would allow third-party involvement, which sex workers said would provide them important protections, but Christian anti-trafficking activists claimed would facilitate sex trafficking.

==== France ====
In 2016, the French government estimated that there were around 30,000 prostitutes in the country, and 93% of them were foreign. In April 2016, the French National Assembly passed a law that partially decriminalized sex work. While selling sex, loitering, and public soliciting by prostitutes is now legal, paying for sex carries a fine of around 1,500 euros. People found guilty of paying for sex may also have to complete an "awareness-raising course on the fight against the purchase of sexual acts".

The French government also attempted to fight prostitution by providing compensation to sex workers who wanted to leave the sex industry. However, although the government hoped to help 600 prostitutes by 2018, only 55 sex workers signed up for the program. Some sex workers argue that the monthly stipend, which is 330 euros, is not enough money to make ends meet.

The 2016 law has also resulted in increased violence against sex workers. Because of the heightened police presence, the sex work that does happen has been pushed off the streets and into areas with limited surveillance. This has created more dangerous conditions for prostitutes that continue to work. According to a survey conducted by the French NGO Médecins du Monde, 42% of percent of prostitutes in France say that they have been exposed to more violence since the law took effect in 2016.

==== Sweden ====
Sweden passed a law in 1999 which criminalised buying sex, while maintaining that selling sex is legal. Kulick (2003) and Matthews (2008) have labelled this Swedish law 'prohibitionist' (with Kulick arguing Sweden was 'abolitionist' before 1999), while Niklas Jakobsson & Andreas Kotsadam (2010) called it 'neo-abolitionist'. Since the implementation of the law, supporters of this approach have claimed the number of prostitutes has decreased. However, this may just be a result of the increased police surveillance, as many sex workers are leaving the streets and turning instead to other spaces, including the internet.

Pye Jakobsson, a spokeswoman for the Rose Alliance which represents sex workers, believes that this reduction in numbers of street workers may not necessarily mean less prostitution, pointing to the 50% of sex workers who work indoors. Jakobsson claims that "you can't talk about protecting sex workers as well as saying the law is good, because it's driving prostitution and trafficking underground, which reduces social services' access to victims."

In a 2010 review, the Swedish government agreed with Swedish sex workers that this model has increased stigma against sex workers. However, the Swedish government viewed this as a positive outcome, arguing that sending a message about sex work is more important.

Sex workers have reported a number of human rights violations as a direct result of these laws, including the deportation of sex workers, increased evictions, increased vulnerability to homelessness, and high rates of discrimination from authorities. The 1999 law has also led to sex workers being used as witnesses by the police in cases that they did not want to be a part of. In addition, because police oftentimes use condoms as evidence in these cases, condom use has gone down among Swedish sex workers and customers. By 2021, the Christian anti-prostitution and anti-pornography NGO Talita reportedly had major influence in the public debate about sex work, as it was frequently cited in news and opinion articles in Swedish media, which tended to focus on the alleged harmful aspects. Swedish sex workers think that Talita and the media used "overly negative wordings", and attempts to incorrectly link all sex work to human trafficking only increased stigmatisation. Workers have argued that "it would be better to hold a realistic discussion about the pros and cons, instead demonising it as a whole."

=== Legalisation (regulationist) practice ===
==== Denmark ====
In Denmark, prostitution was legalised in 1999, allowing for both selling and buying of sex to be legal as long as both participants are above the age of 18. Brothels and pimping, however, still remain illegal in the country. Previously, sex workers were permitted to work as long as it was not their only source of income.

==== Germany ====
Germany legalized sex work in 2002. The 2002 law mandated that sex workers register themselves and pay taxes. In return, their employers would have to provide benefits like health care and paid leave. In addition, customers of sex workers are not allowed to deny payment because they "aren't satisfied". After the law was put in place, the German sex industry boomed. According to 2005 estimates by the German federal government, there are about 400,000 sex workers in Germany, and over 1.2 million men pay for their services every day.

The implementation of the law was flawed because of a lack of outreach and training. As a result, the law was interpreted differently in different cities. In Berlin, the law was interpreted in ways that are favorable to sex workers; in Cologne, a "pleasure tax" that only applies to sex work was imposed.

A 2014 article in The Daily Telegraph claimed that, while this law was designed to protect the rights of sex workers and recognise their occupation as a job like any other, it has instead resulted in massive, multi-story brothels and the introduction of roadside "sex boxes" (German: Verrichtungsboxen).

==== Netherlands ====
The Netherlands lifted the 1911 brothel ban in 2000, earning its international status as a symbol of a 'liberal' approach to sex work. The Dutch legalisation model was contrasted with the neo-abolitionist model introduced by Sweden in 1999. According to Heumann et al. (2017), the 1911 brothel ban was vaguely formulated, poorly enforced, and sex workers themselves were not criminalised, but despite this pre-2000 'regulated tolerance' (Dutch: gedoogbeleid), they were still stigmatised as 'fallen' or 'sinful' women, or 'psychiatrically disturbed'. Feminists (concerned about women's rights and oppression) and conservatives (concerned about public order, 'morality' and women's 'dignity') reached a rough agreement in the 1980s to legalise sex work while countering sex trafficking. However, the Repeal Bill (to lift the 1911 brothel ban) and Trafficking Bill proposed together in 1987 and passed by Parliament were put on hold in the Senate, and finally blocked in 1989 by the new fervent abolitionist Justice Minister Ernst Hirsch Ballin (Christian Democrats). He heavily revised both bills to the effect that all migrant women were considered trafficking victims; these proposals were strongly opposed by the Senate in 1992. Eventually a thoroughly altered version of the Trafficking Bill was approved in 1993, while the Repeal Bill was postponed indefinitely. The Repeal Bill was taken up again in 1997 by the first secular government coalition of the Netherlands, involving social democrats (PvdA), conservative liberals (VVD) and progressive liberals (D66), who agreed on lifting the ban in 1999, which went into effect in 2000. The theory behind the government's legalisation was harm reduction, to increase the visibility of criminal activities and to fight trafficking, and overall better governmental control over prostitution. Migrant sex workers without a residence permit were not allowed to work legally. After 2000, certain interpretations of the law and further local legal restrictions introduced various neo-abolitionist elements into the Dutch situation, pushing especially migrant sex workers into illegality. Moreover, sex workers' rights including labour rights were pushed to the background and undermined, either by the government by invoking 'protection', or by the major brothel companies, who were the only ones capable of complying to the strict licensing requirements and paying for them, and capable of using lawyers to evade taxes and undermine the rights of sex workers.

==== Nevada, United States ====
Legality of brothel prostitution in Nevada by county: Permitted, at least 1 active brothel Permitted, no active brothels Not permitted

Nevada is the only state in the United States in which prostitution is legal, although only in 10 rural counties and only in licensed houses.

There was no state law on prostitution in Nevada until 1971, when a section of the Nevada Revised Statutes effectively legalized prostitution in counties with a population of under 400,000. In the mid-1970s, a man named Walter Plankinton attempted to open a brothel in Nye County, Nevada. County officials initially blocked him from opening the brothel (which he planned to call "The Chicken Ranch"), citing a 1948 state law that called brothels a "nuisance". However, this law was overturned by the Nevada Supreme Court in 1978. In 1980, the Nevada Supreme Court officially legalized prostitution in counties with a population of under 400,000. However, prostitution outside of a "licensed house of prostitution" was not banned until 1987, when the Nevada Revised Statutes made it explicitly illegal.

Sex work in Nevada is regulated in the ten counties and five cities that permit it. Prostitutes are regulated by a patchwork of both state and local laws that address a number of different areas. Zoning laws in Nevada prohibit brothels from being located near a school, house of worship, or main road. Brothels are also barred from advertising on public roads or in districts where prostitution is illegal. The county licenses for brothels are very expensive, to the point of being a significant item in county revenue. Other existing regulations mandate STI testing before prostitutes are hired, and weekly testing once they are employed. Sex workers with HIV are also prohibited from working. Sex workers who continue to work after testing HIV-positive can be punished with two to ten years in prison or a $10,000 fine.

=== Decriminalisation practice ===
==== Belgium ====
In March 2022, Belgium moved to become the first European country to decriminalise sex work. On 17 March 2022, the Chamber of Representatives of Belgium approved a sexual crimes legislation reform bill, developed under the responsibility of Justice Minister Vincent Van Quickenborne. The reform bill inter alia envisioned a phased decriminalisation of sex work for adults (18 years or older). In the first step, sex work was only legally allowed for self-employed sex workers where they would only be permitted to advertise their own sexual services via designated types of media. This law came into effect on 1 June 2022.

Starting 1 December 2024, Belgium's amended labour law decriminalised sex work under official employment contract, becoming the first in the world to do so. Sex workers working for an employer enjoy all social benefits also enjoyed by other workers, such as maternity leave and state pensions, but also have special protections not found in other sectors, such as requiring employers install a panic button and employees being able to quit without notice.

==== South Africa ====
In November 2022, the Cabinet of South Africa has approved a bill for decriminalizing sex work. The bill has not yet been written into law and once published in the Gazette will be open to the public to comment.

==== Australia ====
Laws covering sex work in Australia are state and territory based, with different regulations in different places. New South Wales, which includes the city of Sydney, decriminalised sex work in 1995 after the Wood Royal Commission showed that police were inappropriate regulators of the sex industry, because criminalisation led to police corruption, great health risks to sex workers and the community, as well as public nuisance.

Legal status of sex work (prostitution) in Australia by state or territory according to model: Decriminalisation: sex work is regarded as regular work and operates outside of criminal law Legalisation / regulation: sex work is legal and regulated, but operates within criminal law, with most activities exempt from criminal penalties Abolitionism: sex work is legal but not regulated, and organised activities such as brothels and pimping are illegal

New South Wales towards prohibition 1908–1976

New South Wales amended the Police Offences Act in 1908 to criminalise men, but not women, who lived off the earnings of prostitution, so that male brothel owners henceforth risked prosecution. The 1924 amendments to the Crimes Act increased these penalties, while police were given more power over the movement of prostitutes; the latter were more exposed to police arrest and violence from clients by these legal restrictions on their male associates. Combined with the criminalisation of gambling and newly introduced drugs, criminal gangs emerged in Sydney, which waged "razor wars" in the streets for the control of all these profitable illegal activities. Changes to the law in 1929 gave the police more power to combat the criminal gangs, who were quickly crushed, but replaced by corrupt police control. By the 1960s, the police corruption over prostitution in Sydney had solidified, and sex workers had to pay regular bribes (called "weighing-in") to the two police branches in the area. Nevertheless, sex workers could still be arrested by the police and be convicted for various prostitution-related offences such as soliciting, consorting, and 'offensive behaviour'. The arrival of American troops from the Vietnam War from 1966 and onwards quickly stimulated the rise of drug- and prostitution-related violent rival criminal syndicates which collaborated with the corrupt police. The conservative Askin Government (Liberal Party) further criminalised sex work in 1968 by introducing extra offences, increasing penalties, and also making it a crime for women to live off the earnings of prostitution; as a result, police bribes and arrests increased, and sex workers were driven further underground.

New South Wales partial decriminalisation and re-criminalisation 1976–1995

When the progressive Wran Government (Labor Party) took office in 1976, libertarians – arguing the state should not interfere with private sexual acts between consenting adults – and feminists – arguing the law discriminated against women, because women selling sex were criminalised, but men buying sex were not – pushed for decriminalisation of most aspects of prostitution, except when it caused public nuisance or involved exploitation. The 1979 legal amendments decriminalised public soliciting and for sex workers to be found on premises used for prostitution, while brothel-keeping was still criminal per the Disorderly Houses Act, and advertising and selling sexual services under the guise of other services such as massage were criminalised; as a result, street prostitution boomed. The police campaigned against these reductions of their authority, while local communities pressured the government for better city planning to avoid public nuisance created by prostitution (the latter caused legal amendments in 1983 prohibiting soliciting near schools, churches, hospitals and dwellings). The new conservative Greiner Government (Liberal Party) taking office in 1988 reversed some Labor policies with the new Summary Offences Act, which increased penalties for all prostitution-related offences and also criminalised customers – although few men have been charged; police corruption increased once again.

New South Wales decriminalisation 1995–present

The new Carr Government (Labor Party) appointed Justice James Roland Wood to lead the Royal Commission into the New South Wales Police Service (1995–1997) to deal with, amongst other things, the police corruption relating to sex work in the state. The Commission concluded that the Disorderly Houses Act enabled police corruption, and because the lack of secure brothels forced many sex workers into the streets, posing greater health risks to themselves and the community, the Commission concluded it was better to enable safe brothels for sex workers. The Government acted upon its findings by amending the Disorderly Houses Act in 1995, making brothels normal businesses requiring no special licence or registration. Brothels could now only be shut down by a formal complaint to the Land and Environment Court, taking away the power of the police to shut down, or threaten to shut down, any brothel as a 'disorderly house', which had been an importance cause of the police corruption. The 1995 amendments also allowed third parties to work with prostitutes again. Thus, New South Wales decriminalised sex work in 1995. A governmental review in 2016 resulted in continuing "support of decriminalisation of sex work as the best way of protecting sex workers and maintaining a more transparent sex work industry".

Northern Territory decriminalisation 2019

In June 2010, the NT Government rejected calls from the NT Sex Workers Outreach Programme for legalisation of brothels. As elsewhere in Australia, legalisation was opposed by the Australian Christian Lobby.

The ALP government, elected in 2016, issued a discussion paper in March 2019. Following the consultation period in May, legislation was prepared, and introduced in September as the Sex Industry Bill. It was referred to committee on 18 September, inviting public submissions. The Economic Policy Scrutiny Committee reported on 20 November, with the Government response on the 26th. The Bill was considered and passed by the Legislative Assembly that day, effectively decriminalising prostitution in the Territory, and coming into force on 16 December 2019. The move was welcomed by the United Nations HIV/AIDS Programme (UNAIDS).

Victoria decriminalisation 2022–2023

In February 2022, Victoria passed legislation to decriminalise sex work. "The Sex Work Decriminalisation Act 2021 will partially abolish street-based sex work offences and associated public health offences, remove the licensing system and move to regulate the industry through existing agencies." From 1 December 2023, a sex services business will be able to operate exactly the same way as any other business in Victoria.

==== New Zealand ====
New Zealand became the first country to decriminalize prostitution in June 2003 with the passage of the Prostitution Reform Act 2003. The purpose of this law was to "decriminalise prostitution (while not endorsing or morally sanctioning prostitution or its use); create a framework to safeguard the human rights of sex workers and protect them from exploitation; promote the welfare and occupational health and safety of sex workers; contribute to public health; and prohibit the use of prostitution of persons under 18 years of age." The PRA also established a certification regime for brothel operators".

Catherine Healy, the national coordinator of the New Zealand Prostitutes' Collective (NZPC), who was part of the driving force for the original 2003 law, in an interview twelve years later, had "detected a marked change in police-sex worker relations after passage of the PRA. 'After decriminalization that dynamic shifted dramatically, and importantly the focus on the sex worker wasn't on the sex worker as a criminal. It was on the rights, safety, health and well being of the sex worker.'" Further, "sex workers in New Zealand are beginning to assert their rights now that the stigma associated with sex work has begun to decrease" as demonstrated by a sex worker successfully prosecuting a brothel owner for sexual harassment by her employer.

==== United States ====
===== Washtenaw County, Michigan =====
On 14 January 2021, Prosecutor Eli Savit of Washtenaw County, Michigan County Prosecutor's Office announced his office would no longer prosecute consensual sex work. The change applies to both sex workers and those seeking to buy sex. In their publicly released policy directive, the office outlined the justification for such change. First, they said, criminalizing sex work is antithetical to Constitutional principles of bodily autonomy and personal liberty. They also emphasized that prohibitionist policies generally result in exploitation and noted that criminalization often causes sex workers to operate in more dangerous environments where they are more likely to be victimized. The Prosecutor's Office also mentioned the negative health effects of criminalization, as well as the disproportionate negative effect of prohibition on transgender sex workers and those from racial and ethnic minorities. Finally, they noted that working in the sex industry is often not an individual's first choice, and the criminal charges they potentially face make it more difficult to seek work in other industries. The policy directive makes special mention of the criminality of instances where a client refuses to use a condom despite the sex worker asking and when a buyer does not pay a sex worker with whom they have engaged in sexual activity. The policy specifies that "pimps" still face criminal charges, but the victims of trafficking do not. Washtenaw thus became the first county in the United States to decriminalise sex work, and the first outside Nevada to legally allow sex work, with Oakland County Chief Assistant Prosecutor David Williams indicating he wanted to follow Washtenaw's example.

===== Montpelier, Vermont =====
On 22 June 2022, the city council of Montpelier, Vermont, pushed for the decriminalization of sex work and the repeal of a local ordinance that prohibits prostitution. On 24 August 2022, Montpelier repealed its prostitution ordinance and is the second city in Vermont to do so.

== See also ==
- Bodily integrity
- Financial deplatforming of sex workers
- Liberty
- List of sex worker organizations
- Prostitution law
- Revolting Prostitutes
- Sex workers' rights
- Sex-positive feminism
- Sex-positive movement
