= Massage Parlours Act 1978 =

Act of Parliament in New Zealand

Massage Parlours Act

New Zealand Parliament
- Long title: An Act to make provision for the supervision and regulation of massage parlours
- Commenced: 9 August 1978 (Section 5 came into force on the 1 April 1979)

Related legislation
- Prostitution Reform Act 2003
- Status: Repealed

The Massage Parlours Act was an Act of Parliament in New Zealand regulating massage parlours.

It was repealed by the Prostitution Reform Act 2003.

== See also ==
- Prostitution in New Zealand
