= Crimes Act 1961 =

Act of Parliament in New Zealand

Crimes Act

New Zealand Parliament
- Long title: An Act to consolidate and amend the Crimes Act 1908 and certain other enactments of the Parliament of New Zealand relating to crimes and other offences
- Royal assent: 1 November 1961
- Commenced: 1 January 1962

Legislative history
- Passed: 1961

Amended by
- Homosexual Law Reform Act 1986; Prostitution Reform Act 2003; Crimes (Substituted Section 59) Amendment Act 2007; Crimes Amendment Act (No 2) 2008; Abortion Legislation Act 2020

Related legislation
- Criminal Procedure Act 2011; Sentencing Act 2002
- Status: Amended

The Crimes Act 1961 is an act of New Zealand Parliament that forms a leading part of the criminal law in New Zealand. It repeals the Crimes Act 1908, itself a successor of the Criminal Code Act 1893. Most crimes in New Zealand are created by the Crimes Act, but some are created elsewhere. All common law offences are abolished by section 9, as are all offences against acts of the British Parliaments, but section 20 saves the old common law defences where they are not specifically altered.

The Crimes Act is administered by the Ministry of Justice. The act has 14 parts dealing with various issues including jurisdiction, punishments, "matters of justification and excuse", crimes against the public order, crimes affecting the administration of law and justice, "crimes against morality and decency, sexual crimes, and crimes against public welfare", "crimes against the person", property crimes, and "threatening, conspiring, and attempting to commit offences." Over the years, the legislation has been amended by several new acts, including the Homosexual Law Reform Act 1986, the Prostitution Reform Act 2003, the Crimes (Substituted Section 59) Amendment Act 2007 ("anti-smacking law"), the Crimes Amendment Act (No 2) 2008, and the Abortion Legislation Act 2020.

== Key provisions ==
=== Punishments (Part 2) ===
Section 13 of the Crimes Act states that the powers of the courts under other acts will not be affected by the Crimes Act. The sections relating to the death penalty and putting under bond have been repealed. In 2026, legislation dealing with labour exploitation, sexual exploitation and human trafficking were strengthened and updated. The language around "unauthorised migrants" was also updated to include both not possessing legal documents required by the state and documents obtained by fraud, deception and forgery.

Section 17 bans solitary confinement as a form of punishment. Section 19 empowers the High Courts to impose fines.

Sections 35 to 56 were amended in 2026 to strengthen citizen's arrest powers in the defence of property and preventing escape by alleged offenders.

=== Matters of justification or excuse (Part 3) ===
Includes infancy, insanity, compulsion, ignorance of law, sentence or process, arrest, use of force, breach of the peace, defence against assault, defence of property, peaceable entry, powers of discipline, surgical procedures, and other general provisions.

Sections 21 and 22 establish the defence of infancy. Children aged under 10 years old are assumed incapable of committing a crime and cannot be charged with any crime. Children aged between 10 and 14 years inclusive have the rebuttable presumption of incapacity to commit a crime; they cannot be charged unless the prosecution can prove the child knew what they were doing was a criminal offence.

Sections 50, 169 and 170 dealt with the provocation defence which mitigated fatal assaults to the lesser charge and penalty due to manslaughter, rather than murder. Section 50, which define provocation, was repealed by section 2(1) of the Crimes Amendment Act 1980. Sections 169 and 170 was repealed in December 2009 through bipartisan consent with the exception of the ACT New Zealand party.

=== Crimes against public order (Part 5) ===
Includes treason and other crimes against the King and the State; offence of oath to commit offence; unlawful assemblies, riots, and breaches of the peace; piracy; slave dealing; participation in criminal gang; and smuggling and trafficking in people.

Section(s) of act	ANZSOC code	Offence	Maximum penalty (imprisonment)
73–75		Treason – conspiracy or attempt	Life imprisonment (mandatory); 14 years
77		Mutiny	10 years
78		Espionage	14 years
79	1559	Sabotage	10 years
87	1313	Riot	2 years
92–94	1559	Piracy	14 years
98	0521	Dealing in slaves	14 years
98A		Participation in organised criminal group	10 years
98C		Smuggling migrants	20 years

=== Crimes affecting the administration of law and justice (Part 6) ===
Includes bribery and corruption; contravention of statute; misleading justice; and escapes and rescues.

Section(s) of act	ANZSOC code	Offence	Maximum penalty (imprisonment)
101		Bribery of judicial officer	7 years
102		Corruption and bribery of Minister of the Crown – Ministers receiving bribes – people giving bribes	14 years 7 years
103		Corruption and bribery of Member of Parliament	7 years
104	1542	Corruption and bribery of law enforcement officer	7 years
109	1561	Perjury	7 to 14 years
110	1561	False oaths	5 years
111	1561	False statements and declarations	3 years
119	1511	Breaking prison	7 years

=== Crimes against morality and decency, sexual crimes, and public welfare (Part 7) ===
Includes crimes against religion; crimes against morality and decency; sexual crimes; sexual offences outside New Zealand; and crimes against public welfare.

Section(s) of act	ANZSOC code	Offence	Maximum penalty (imprisonment)
128–128B	0311	Sexual violation (incl. rape)	20 years
129	0311	Attempted sexual violation, assault with intent to commit sexual violation	10 years
130	0311	Incest	10 years
131	0311	Sexual conduct with dependent family member – sexual connection – attempted sexual connection – indecent act	7 years 7 years 3 years
131B	0321	Meeting young person following sexual grooming, etc.	7 years
132	0311	Sexual conduct with a child under 12 – sexual connection – attempted sexual connection – indecent act	14 years 10 years 10 years
134	0311	Sexual conduct with a young person under 16 – sexual connection – attempted sexual connection – indecent act	10 years 10 years 7 years
135	0312	Indecent assault	7 years
143	1325	Bestiality	7 years
144A		Sexual conduct with children and young people outside New Zealand	as per sections 132 and 134
144C	0321	Organising or promoting child sex tours	7 years
150		Misconduct in respect to human remains (illegal exhumation, necrophilia)	2 years

=== Crimes against the person (Part 8) ===
Includes duties tending to the preservation of life; homicide; murder and manslaughter; abortion; assaults and injuries to the person; female genital mutilation; bigamy and feigned marriage; and abduction and kidnapping.

Section(s) of act	ANZSOC Code	Offence	Maximum penalty (imprisonment)
171A		Manslaughter by strike to head or neck	life imprisonment
172	0111	Murder	Life imprisonment
173	0121	Attempt to murder	14 years
175	0100	Conspiracy to murder	10 years
177	0131	Manslaughter	Life imprisonment
178	0131	Infanticide	3 years
179	0131	Aiding and abetting suicide	14 years
182	0131	Killing unborn child	14 years
183	1695	Abortion procured by person other than health practitioner	5 years
188	0211, 0212	Wounding with intent	7 to 14 years
188A		Wounding with intent by strike to head or neck	15 years
189	0211, 0212	Injuring with intent	5 to 10 years
189A	0211, 0212	Strangulation or suffocation	7 years
189 (2)		Injuring a first responder or frontline corrections worker with intent	7 years
192	0211, 0212	Aggravated assault (including against first responders and frontline corrections workers)	3 years
193	0211, 0212	Assault with intent to injure	2 years
193 (2) and (3)		Assaulting a first responder or frontline corrections worker with intent to injure	5 years
194	0211, 0212	Assault on a child, or by a male on a female	2 years
194A	0211, 0212	Assault on person in family relationship	2 years
195	0491	Ill-treatment or neglect of child or vulnerable adult	10 years
195A	0491	Failure to protect child or vulnerable adult	10 years
196	0213	Common assault	1 year
198	0299	Discharging firearm or doing dangerous act with intent	7 to 14 years
198A	0211, 0212	Using any firearm against law enforcement officer, etc.	10 to 17 years
198B	0211, 0212	Commission of crime with firearm	10 years
204A-204B		Female genital mutilation and ancillary offences	7 years
206	1329	Bigamy	2 to 14 years
208	0511	Abduction for purposes of marriage or sexual connection	14 years
209	0511	Kidnapping	14 years

=== Crimes against rights of property (Part 10) ===
Section(s) of act	ANZSOC code	Offence	Maximum penalty (imprisonment)
219A		Theft in offensive, insulting, or disorderly manner: value up to $2,000	2 years
220–223	0811, 0813, 0821, 0823, 0829, 0991	Theft or stealing – by persons in special relationship – of livestock and other animals – value $1001 or more – value $501 to $1000 – value up to $500	7 years 7 years 7 years 1 year 3 months
226	0812	Conversion of vehicle or other conveyance	7 years
231	0711	Burglary	10 years
231A	0711	Entry onto agricultural land with intent to commit imprisonable offence	10 years
234	0612	Robbery	10 years
241		Punishment of obtaining by deception or causing loss by deception	1 year (and/or $2,000 fine)
243	0831	Money laundering	5 to 7 years
247		Punishing of receiving stolen goods	1 year (and/or $2,000 fine)
250	0499	Damaging or interfering with computer system	7 to 10 years
256	0921, 0922	Forgery	3 to 10 years
266	0921	Counterfeiting	7 years
267	1211	Arson	7 to 14 years

=== Threatening, conspiring, and attempting to commit offences (Part 11) ===
Section(s) of act	ANZSOC code	Offence	Maximum penalty (imprisonment)
306	0532	Threatening to kill or do grievous bodily harm	7 years
310		Conspiring to commit offence (where not explicitly stated elsewhere)	7 years or the maximum imprisonment for the crime, whichever is less
312		Accessory after the fact to crime (where not explicitly stated elsewhere) – to crimes punishable by life imprisonment – to all other crimes	7 years 5 years or half the maximum imprisonment for the crime, whichever is less

== History ==
Prior to the 1880s, the colony of New Zealand made few changes to the English criminal law adopted in 1840, aside from adopting the 1861 English reforms in 1867. One recommendation from the commissioners that consolidated the New Zealand statutes, prior to enactment of the Statutes Revision Act 1879 that allowed for their reprinting, was that the criminal law should be codified in a way that suited New Zealand conditions, rather than merely adopting similar legislative changes being debated in 1880 by the British Parliament. A Criminal Code bill was first drafted in 1883 and introduced into the House of Representatives in June that year. However, over the next 10 years the bill's passage through the Parliament failed to achieve majority support at various stages, despite repeated introductions and initial support. The bill was finally passed at the end of September 1893 and the Criminal Code Act 1893 received royal assent on 6 October 1893.

Enactment of the Consolidated Statutes Enactment Act 1908 on 4 August 1908 resulted in the Criminal Code Act 1893 being consolidated into the Crimes Act 1908. The 1908 act was further consolidated and amended with the passage of the Crimes Act 1961 on 1 November 1961.

=== Amendments ===
The Crimes Act has been substantially amended since 1961:

==== Punishment (Part 2) ====
Section 14 of the Crimes Act 1961 allowed death sentences. However, due to growing general public opposition to the death penalty, reformist New Zealand National Party Minister of Justice Ralph Hanan and other National MPs exercised a conscience vote and voted with the abolitionist New Zealand Labour Party to forbid judges passing sentence of death other than in cases of treason. That was the functional abolition in New Zealand, with no one executed after this date. In 1989, the death penalty was formally abolished by the Fourth Labour Government.

==== Matters of justification or excuse (Part 3) ====
The Crimes (Substituted Section 59) Amendment Act 2007 abolished Section 59 of the Crimes Act, which had previously allowed parental corporal punishment of children, despite opposition from religious social conservatives and others.

==== Crimes against morality and decency, sexual crimes, and public welfare (Part 7) ====
Amendments in 1985 resulted in crime of rape being replaced with one of sexual violation, a similar offence but without gender specificity. Further changes in 2005 resulted in gender specificity being removed from all criminal sexual offences.

The Crimes Amendment Act (No 3) 1985 (commenced 1 February 1986) criminalised marital rape and added the offence of sexual violation by unlawful sexual connection, criminalising female-on-male sexual violation and expanding sexual violation to include anal and oral intercourse.

The Homosexual Law Reform Act 1986 amended the Crimes Act, allowing for consensual homosexual relationships between men.

In 1995, the Crimes Amendment Act 1995 (No 49) inserted Sections 144A, 144B, and 144C which deal with sexual offenses outside of New Zealand. Section 144A of the Crimes Act deals with New Zealand citizens and ordinary residents that commit acts of child sexual abuse in overseas jurisdictions through child sex tourism. It applies existing prohibitions against sexual connection and indecent acts with children under twelve and young people to children within overseas jurisdictions. Under Section 144C, it is also illegal to promote child sex tourism overseas from New Zealand.

In 2003, the Prostitution Reform Act 2003 decriminalised sex work, removing sections 147-149A of the Crimes Act, which had formerly prohibited most forms of prostitution in New Zealand through maintaining criminal penalties against soliciting, living off the proceeds of sex work, brothel-keeping and managing sex workers.

In 2005, the Crimes Amendment Act 2005 (commenced 20 July 2005) amended the Crimes Act 1961 to make most sexual offences gender-neutral. This closed a legal loophole which prevented adult females from being convicted of sexual offending against boys under 16.

In March 2019, Parliament unanimously passed the Crimes Amendment Bill repealing Section 123, which dealt with the Crime against Religion of blasphemous libel, in accordance with modern religious pluralism and free speech sensibilities.

==== Crimes against the person (Part 8) ====
In 1987, Section 187A of the Crimes Act was inserted, permitting abortion on the grounds of saving the mother's life, mental health, and physical health; foetal abnormality within the 20 weeks gestation period; and incest or sexual intercourse with guardians and family members.

In January 1996, the Crimes Amendment Act 1995 inserted Section 20A, which outlaws female genital mutilation within New Zealand, and Section 204B, which deals with ancillary and related offences.

In 2002, the Sentencing Act 2002 changed the penalty for murder from mandatory life imprisonment to presumptive life imprisonment; sentencing judges now may waive the mandatory life imprisonment requirement and give a lesser sentence in exceptional ("manifestly unjust") circumstances.

In 2018, the Family Violence (Amendments) Act 2018 inserted new offenses relating to strangulation or suffocation (Section 189A), assault on person in a family relationship (Section 194A), coerced marriages or civil unions (Section 207A), and abductions for the purposes of marriage or civil union or sexual connection (Section 208).

In March 2020, the Abortion Legislation Act 2020 replaced Sections 182A to 187A with Section 183, which states that abortion is only an offense if a person who is not a health practitioner procures or performs an abortion on a woman. The woman is not guilty of the offense.

Euthanasia in New Zealand was formerly illegal under Sections 160 (culpable homicide), 173 (attempting to murder) and 179 (aiding and abetting suicide). Four attempts have been made to decriminalise assisted suicide through parliamentary bills in 1995, 2003, 2012, and 2019. In November 2019, David Seymour's End of Life Choice Bill passed its third reading. A binding referendum was held during the 2020 general election in September 2020 to pass the End of Life Choice Bill into law. Three quarters of voters supported reform, which took effect in early November 2021.

On 6 August 2026, the Crimes Amendment Act 2026 created new offences for assaulting first responders and coward punching, raised penalties for shoplifting and human trafficking, and expanded citizen's arrest powers.

==== Crimes against property (Part 10) ====
Part 10 of the act, Crimes against the right of property, was totally rewritten in 2003. In doing so, the definition of Burglary was revised and simplified to only require entry to be unauthorised rather than also requiring an act of breaking.

In 2019, the Crimes Amendment Act 2019 (No 4) introduced the concept of Burglary of agricultural land along with increasing penalties for Theft of animals, in response to increasing reports of stock rustling as well as nighttime hunting, slaughtering and butchering of farm animals in roadside fields.

== See also ==
- Abortion in New Zealand
- Blasphemy law in New Zealand
- Capital punishment in New Zealand
- Crime in New Zealand
- Criminal Records (Clean Slate) Act 2004
- Euthanasia in New Zealand
- Homosexual Law Reform Act 1986
- Lists of acts of the New Zealand Parliament
- Prostitution in New Zealand
