= Gillian Abel =

New Zealand public health researcher

- Education: University of Otago
- Scientific career
- Institutions: University of Otago
- Thesis: Decriminalisation: A harm minimisation and human rights approach to regulating sex work (2010)
- Doctoral advisor: Elisabeth Wells, Lisa Fitzgerald, Cheryl Brunton

Gillian Abel is a New Zealand public health researcher and as of 2021 head of the Department of Population Health at the University of Otago in Christchurch.

== Education ==
After a receiving a diploma from Cape Peninsula University of Technology in Cape Town, Abel moved to New Zealand in 1997 to work at the University of Otago. She graduated from Otago in 2010 with a PhD. Her thesis was titled "Decriminalisation: A harm minimisation and human rights approach to regulating sex work".

== Career ==
Abel's early career focused on hematology before making a career change to focus on public health. In December 2019 Abel was promoted to full professor in the Department of Population Health at Otago with effect from 1 February 2020. She is also head of the department.

Abel's research focuses on vulnerable populations, including sex workers, vulnerable youth, and Pacific people. Abel was involved in leading an influential research project funded by the Health Research Council, which analyzed the impact of the Prostitution Reform Act on the lives of sex workers. This study has informed policy-making in New Zealand and worldwide.

=== Research Interests ===
- Sex work research, explicitly about stigma, decriminalization, and social change
- Youth physical and sexual health
- Community-based participatory research with street-based sex work
- Sex work employment rights
- Destigmatisation of HIV/AIDS

== Selected publications ==
=== Books ===
- Abel, Gillian; Fitzgerald, Lisa; Healy, Catherine; Taylor, Aline, eds. (19 May 2010), Taking the crime out of sex work: New Zealand sex workers' fight for decriminalisation, Policy Press (published 2010), ISBN 978-1-84742-335-1
- Armstrong, Lynzi; Abel, Gillian, eds. (22 July 2020), Sex work and the New Zealand model: Decriminalisation and social change (1st ed.), Bristol University Press (published 2020), ISBN 978-1-5292-0577-0

=== Journal articles ===
- Gillian Michelle Abel; Lee Thompson (29 May 2017). ""I don't want to look like an AIDS victim": A New Zealand case study of facial lipoatrophy". Health & Social Care in the Community. 26 (1): 41–47. doi:10.1111/HSC.12459. ISSN 0966-0410. PMID 28557181.
- Gillian Abel (30 August 2018). "Decriminalisation of sex work protects human rights". The BMJ. 362 k3630. doi:10.1136/BMJ.K3630. ISSN 0959-8138. PMID 30166284.
- Christina McKerchar; Moira Smith; Ryan Gage; Jonathan Williman; Gillian Michelle Abel; Cameron Lacey; Clíona Ní Mhurchú; Louise Signal (18 July 2020). "Kids in a Candy Store: An Objective Analysis of Children's Interactions with Food in Convenience Stores". Nutrients. 12 (7): 2143. doi:10.3390/NU12072143. ISSN 2072-6643. PMC 7400802. PMID 32708485.
