= Untold Intimacies =

2025 book by Cheryl Ware

Untold Intimacies: A History of Sex Work in Aotearoa, 1978–2008
- Author: Cheryl Ware
- Subject: Sex work in New Zealand
- Genre: Non-fiction
- Set in: New Zealand
- Publisher: University of Auckland Press
- Publication date: 10 July 2025
- Media type: paperback

Untold Intimacies: A History of Sex Work in Aotearoa, 1978–2008 is a 2025 book by New Zealand historian Cheryl Ware published by Auckland University Press.

Based on the lives of 25 workers, the book documents the stories of workers straddling the Prostitution Reform Act 2003, which decriminalised sex work in New Zealand. The book is based on work funded by a Marsden Fast Start Grant, a postdoctoral Kate Edger Education Award, and a Judith Binney Writing Award.
