= Suetonia Palmer =

New Zealand nephrology academic

Suetonia Palmer FRSNZ
- Other name: Suetonia Cressida Green
- Education: University of Otago
- Scientific career
- Workplaces: University of Otago
- Thesis: Kidney function in cardiovascular disease (2009)
- Website: suetoniapalmer.ac.nz

Suetonia Cressida Palmer FRSNZ is a New Zealand nephrology academic, and as of 2019 is a full professor at the University of Otago.

== Academic career ==
After a 2009 PhD titled Kidney function in cardiovascular disease at the University of Otago, Palmer rose to full professor.

In 2022, Palmer was elected a Fellow of the Royal Society of New Zealand. In 2024, the University of Otago awarded Palmer the title of Poutoko Taiea Distinguished Professor, to begin January 2025.

== Selected works ==
- Palmer, Suetonia C., Sankar D. Navaneethan, Jonathan C. Craig, David W. Johnson, Marcello Tonelli, Amit X. Garg, Fabio Pellegrini et al. "Meta-analysis: erythropoiesis-stimulating agents in patients with chronic kidney disease." Annals of internal medicine 153, no. 1 (2010): 23–33.
- Ravani, Pietro, Suetonia C. Palmer, Matthew J. Oliver, Robert R. Quinn, Jennifer M. MacRae, Davina J. Tai, Neesh I. Pannu et al. "Associations between hemodialysis access type and clinical outcomes: a systematic review." Journal of the American Society of Nephrology 24, no. 3 (2013): 465–473.
- Palmer, Suetonia, Mariacristina Vecchio, Jonathan C. Craig, Marcello Tonelli, David W. Johnson, Antonio Nicolucci, Fabio Pellegrini et al. "Prevalence of depression in chronic kidney disease: systematic review and meta-analysis of observational studies." Kidney international 84, no. 1 (2013): 179–191.
- Palmer, Suetonia C., Jonathan C. Craig, Sankar D. Navaneethan, Marcello Tonelli, Fabio Pellegrini, and Giovanni FM Strippoli. "Benefits and harms of statin therapy for persons with chronic kidney disease: a systematic review and meta-analysis." Annals of internal medicine 157, no. 4 (2012): 263.
