= European Journal of Vascular and Endovascular Surgery =

- Discipline: Surgery
- Language: English
- Edited by: F. Dick

Publication details
- History: 1987-present
- Publisher: Elsevier on behalf of the European Society for Vascular Surgery
- Frequency: Monthly
- Impact factor: 5.328 (2019)

Standard abbreviations
- ISO 4: Eur. J. Vasc. Endovasc. Surg.

Indexing
- ISSN: 1078-5884

Links
- Journal homepage; Online access

The European Journal of Vascular and Endovascular Surgery is a monthly peer-reviewed journal publishing articles describing endovascular methods and their critical evaluation. According to the Journal Citation Reports, the journal has a 2019 impact factor of 5.328.
