= Criminal Records (Clean Slate) Act 2004 =

Act of Parliament in New Zealand

Criminal Records (Clean Slate) Act

New Zealand Parliament
- Royal assent: 16 May 2004
- Commenced: 29 November 2004

Legislative history
- Introduced by: Nándor Tánczos; (Green Party)
- Passed: 11 May 2004

Related legislation
- Crimes Act 1961
- Status: Current legislation

The Criminal Records (Clean Slate) Act 2004 is an Act of Parliament in New Zealand administered by the Ministry of Justice. It allows for a criminal record to be hidden from the public if the person is eligible.

At the time the act was passed, the Ministry of Justice estimated that it may be applicable to 500,000 people (an eighth of the country's population at the time), the majority of which committed a minor offence in their youth. In 2015 it was reported that just over 220,000 people have had their convictions wiped since the Act was introduced in 2004.

== Eligibility ==
In order to be eligible under the Act a person must have:

- no convictions within the last 7 years;
- never been sentenced to a custodial sentence (e.g. imprisonment, corrective training, borstal);
- never been ordered by a Court during a criminal case to be detained in a hospital due to his/her mental condition, instead of being sentenced;
- not been convicted of a "specified offence" (e.g. sexual offending against children and young people or the mentally impaired)
- paid in full any fine, reparation or costs ordered by the Court in a criminal case;
- never been indefinitely disqualified from driving under section 65 of the Land Transport Act 1998 or earlier equivalent provision.

In certain cases, a person cannot hide their past criminal record under the Act, such as when a person applies to work for the New Zealand Police or a job involving national security.

== See also ==
- Crimes Act 1961
- New Zealand Police
