= Elisabeth Wells =

New Zealand biostatistician

Academic background
- Education: University of Canterbury, University of Canterbury
- Thesis: Some psychological parameters of verbal encoding (1970)

Academic work
- Institutions: University of Toronto, Massey University, University of Otago
- Doctoral students: Gillian Abel

Jessie Elisabeth Wells is a New Zealand biostatistician, and is a professor emerita at the University of Otago, specialising in epidemiology and mental health research.

== Academic career ==
Wells completed a PhD titled Some psychological parameters of verbal encoding at the University of Canterbury. Wells completed three years of postdoctoral research at the University of Toronto, before returning to New Zealand to join the faculty of Massey University. After six years at Massey, Wells moved to the University of Otago in 1980, rising to research professor in 2010. Wells is part of the Biostatistics and Computational Biology Unit at Otago, and is based at the Christchurch campus. She was appointed professor emerita in 2013.

Wells is both a principal investigator and the principal statistician on the New Zealand Mental Health Survey, which was a survey of New Zealanders carried out over 2003 and 2004, examining occurrence, prevention, and treatment of mental health. Wells's research on the survey, alongside colleagues Magnus McGee, Joanne Baxter and Jesse Kokaua, showed that non-medical drug use was widespread in New Zealand. The most commonly used drugs were alcohol, which 94% of survey respondents had tried, and tobacco, which more than half had tried. Wells has received grants from the Health Research Council, the New Zealand Lottery Grants Board health allocation, and the Canterbury Medical Research Foundation. She has held research contracts from the Ministry of Health, Ngai Tahu Development Corporation, the Public Health Commission and the Mental Health Commission.

In 2009 Wells was awarded the university's Gold Medal for Research Excellence.

== Selected works ==
- Weissman, Myrna; R C Bland; G J Canino; et al. (1996). "Cross-national epidemiology of major depression and bipolar disorder". JAMA. 276 (4): 293–299. doi:10.1001/jama.1996.03540040037030. PMID 8656541. Wikidata Q47826731.
- Kathleen R Merikangas; Robert Jin; Jian-Ping He; et al. (2011). "Prevalence and correlates of bipolar spectrum disorder in the world mental health survey initiative". JAMA Psychiatry. 68 (3): 241–251. doi:10.1001/archgenpsychiatry.2011.12. PMC 3486639. PMID 21383262. Wikidata Q34026000.
- Philip S Wang; Sergio Aguilar-Gaxiola; Jordi Alonso; et al. (2007). "Use of mental health services for anxiety, mood, and substance disorders in 17 countries in the WHO world mental health surveys". The Lancet. 370 (9590): 841–850. doi:10.1016/s0140-6736(07)61414-7. PMC 2847360. PMID 17826169. Wikidata Q33760792.
- Laura Helena Andrade; J Alonso; Z Mneimneh; et al. (2013). "Barriers to mental health treatment: results from the WHO World Mental Health surveys". Psychological Medicine. 44 (6): 1303–1317. doi:10.1017/s0033291713001943. PMC 4100460. PMID 23931656. Wikidata Q33908978.
- Weissman, Myrna; Bland R; Joyce, Peter Richard; Newman S; Wells, Elisabeth; Wittchen, Hans-Ulrich (1993). "Sex differences in rates of depression: cross-national perspectives". Journal of Affective Disorders. 29 (2–3): 77–84. doi:10.1016/0165-0327(93)90025-f. PMID 8300980. Wikidata Q47252141.
- Weissman, Myrna; R C Bland; G J Canino; et al. (1999). "Prevalence of suicide ideation and suicide attempts in nine countries". Psychological Medicine. 29 (1): 9–17. doi:10.1017/s0033291798007867. PMID 10077289. Wikidata Q47725617.
- Weissman, Myrna; Bland RC; Canino GJ; et al. (1997). "The cross-national epidemiology of panic disorder". JAMA Psychiatry. 54 (4): 305–309. doi:10.1001/archpsyc.1997.01830160021003. PMID 9107146. Wikidata Q47796973.
