= Health & Social Care in the Community =

- Discipline: Community health, public health, social work
- Language: English

Publication details
- History: 1993–present
- Publisher: John Wiley & Sons
- Frequency: Bimonthly
- Impact factor: 2.821 (2020)

Standard abbreviations
- ISO 4: Health Soc. Care Community

Indexing
- CODEN: HSCCEL
- ISSN: 0966-0410 (print); 1365-2524 (web)
- LCCN: 95007448 sn 95007448
- OCLC no.: 27415487

Links
- Journal homepage; Online access; Online archive

Health & Social Care in the Community is a bimonthly peer-reviewed academic journal covering all aspects community health, health care, and social work. It was established in 1993 and is published by John Wiley & Sons. According to the Journal Citation Reports, the journal has a 2020 impact factor of 2.821, ranking it 7th out of 44 journals in the category "Social Work".
