= University of Otago, Christchurch =

Medical school in Christchurch, New Zealand

Coordinates: 43.5344°S 172.6259°E

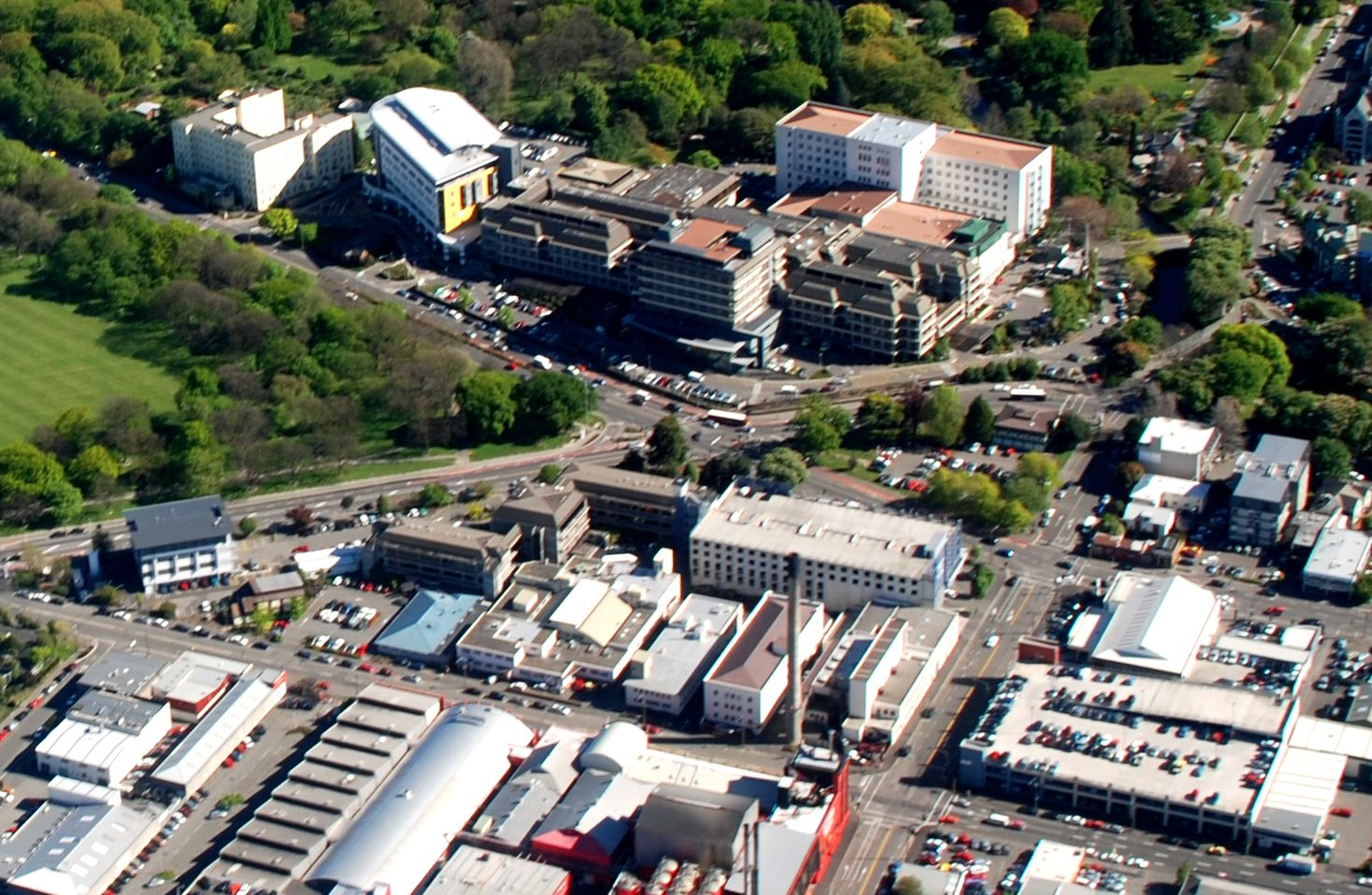
Christchurch Hospital (2009)

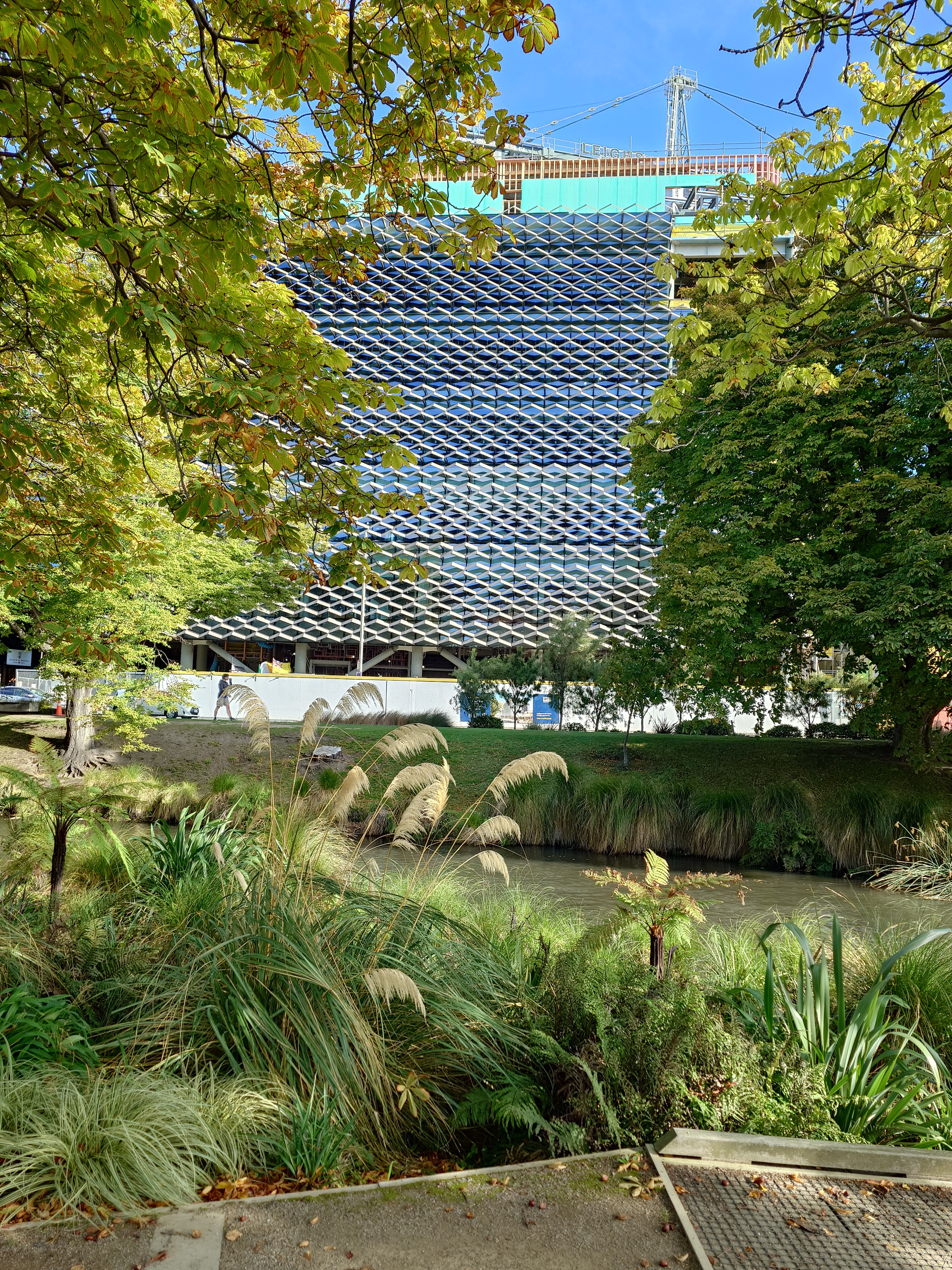
The new six-storey campus under construction on Oxford Terrace (March 2025)

The University of Otago, Christchurch is one of seven component schools that make up the University of Otago Division of Health Sciences. The University of Otago, Christchurch is based primarily at Christchurch Hospital, in Christchurch Central City, and works in partnership with the Canterbury District Health Board.

It has over 1,000 medical and postgraduate students on campus.

All University of Otago medical students who gain entry after the competitive Health Sciences First Year programme, or who gain entry via alternative admissions pathways, spend their second and third years studying at Otago Medical School in Dunedin. In their fourth, fifth, and sixth years, medical students can either continue to study in Dunedin, or at the Christchurch or Wellington campuses.

== History ==
Starting in 1924, students could complete their last year of training at hospitals in either Auckland, Christchurch, or Wellington as well as Dunedin. In 1938, branch faculties were established in Christchurch, Auckland, and Wellington. The Christchurch branch faculty became a clinical medical school in 1973, the forerunner to the University of Otago, Christchurch. The inaugural dean was George Rolleston.

Professor David Murdoch was Dean of the University of Otago, Christchurch from 2016 to 2021, when he was appointed Vice-Chancellor of the University of Otago.

Professor Suzanne Pitama, the first Māori female Dean of any University of Otago medical campus, was appointed Dean in 2021.

In 2022, construction started on a new campus on Oxford Terrace/Tuam Street in the city centre. It is expected to be a medical school and construction is scheduled to be complete in April 2026. It is a six-storey building that will hold four floors of clinical research facilities, laboratories and teaching facilities. In 2024, the new campus (under construction) was named "Wai-Ora" in recognition of Ngāi Tahu and the water of the nearby Avon River / Ōtākaro.
