= Prostitution Reform Act 2003 =

Act of Parliament in New Zealand

Prostitution Reform Act

New Zealand Parliament
- Royal assent: 27 June 2003
- Commenced: 28 June 2003
- Administered by: Ministry of Justice

Legislative history
- Introduced by: Tim Barnett
- Introduced: 21 September 2000
- First reading: 8 November 2000
- Second reading: 19 February 2003
- Third reading: 25 June 2003

Related legislation
- Crimes Act 1961; Massage Parlours Act 1978; Summary Offences Act 1981
- Status: Current legislation

The Prostitution Reform Act 2003 is an Act of Parliament that decriminalised prostitution in New Zealand. The Act also gave new rights to sex workers. It has attracted international attention, although its reception has been mixed. The Act repealed the Massage Parlours Act 1978 and the associated regulations.

The Act was introduced as a member's bill by Tim Barnett after being drawn from a ballot. Members were allowed a conscience vote, and on 25 June 2003, the bill passed its third reading by a margin of one vote (60–59), after the country's only Muslim MP, Ashraf Choudhary, voted to abstain, thereby allowing the bill to narrowly pass.

== Legislative features ==
The Prostitution Reform Act decriminalises prostitution and gives new rights to sex workers. The Act also repealed the Massage Parlours Act, effectively eliminating voluntary adult (age 18 and up) prostitution from criminal law and replacing it with civil law at both the national and local levels. The Summary Offences Act remains in force in relation to soliciting, which may be classed as offensive behaviour.

=== Purpose of the Act ===
Section 3 of the Act defines its purpose:

The purpose of this Act is to decriminalise prostitution (while not endorsing or morally sanctioning prostitution or its use) and to create a framework that—

(a) safeguards the human rights of sex workers and protects them from exploitation:
(b) promotes the welfare and occupational health and safety of sex workers:
(c) is conducive to public health:
(d) prohibits the use in prostitution of persons under 18 years of age:
(e) implements certain other related reforms.

— Prostitution Reform Act 2003 s3

=== Commercial sexual services ===
Section 11 prohibits advertising commercial sexual services on radio, television, in a cinema, and outside the classifieds section of a newspaper or periodical. Offenders may be fined up to $10,000 for an individual and $50,000 for a corporation.

Section 16 prohibits inducing or compelling a person to provide commercial sexual services, including providing payment or reward derived from such services. Convicted offenders may be imprisoned for up to 14 years.

Section 17 recognises sex workers have the right to refuse to provide commercial sexual services, and entering into a contract to provide services does not imply sexual consent. However, the refusal to provide services does not limit contract law; for example, a client may invoke the Consumer Guarantees Act 1993 and ask for a refund for services paid for but not rendered.

Section 18 provides that working, or refusing to work, as a sex worker does not affect entitlements to social security or to ACC.

Section 19 prohibits granting any visa and the right to refuse entry to a person who has provided or invested in, or intends to provide or invest in, commercial sexual services. It also adds a condition to all temporary visas that the holder may not provide or invest in commercial sexual services while in New Zealand. Offenders breaching this section are liable to deportation.

Sections 20 to 23 prohibit assisting people under 18 to provide commercial sexual services, receive earnings from commercial sexual services provided by person under 18 years, or contract for commercial sexual services from, or be client of, a person under 18 years. Convicted offenders may be imprisoned for up to 7 years.

== History ==
=== Existing law ===
Prostitution-related statute law passed in the second half of the 20th century included the Crimes Act 1961, the Massage Parlours Act 1978, and the Summary Offences Act 1981. Section 26 of the Summary Offences Act prohibited soliciting; Section 147 of the Crimes Act prohibited brothel-keeping; Section 148 lived on the earnings of prostitution; and Section 149 procured. In 2000, the Crimes Act was amended to criminalise both clients and operators where workers were under 18 (the age of consent for sexual activity is 16). Young people under 18 were still classified as offenders after this came into force, until the passage of the Prostitution Reform Act 2003.

Indoor prostitution in New Zealand was governed by the Massage Parlours Act 1978 prior to the Prostitution Reform Act 2003, which enabled brothels to operate under the guise of massage parlours. However, because the act designated massage parlours as public venues, laws prohibiting soliciting in a public place extended to parlour workers, and they were occasionally searched by police acting as clients. Workers in the parlours were also required to inform the police with their names and addresses. It was prohibited to advertise the selling of sex ("soliciting"), establish a brothel, or live off the proceeds of prostitution.

=== Background ===
When Labour gained power in 1999, Labour MP Tim Barnett (Christchurch Central) was in charge of introducing a member's bill to decriminalise prostitution. This was based on the New South Wales harm reduction model (1996). The bill was introduced on 21 September 2000, and was drawn as number 3 in the ballot box.

Party support for the bill came from the Greens, particularly from Green MP Sue Bradford. It was opposed by New Zealand First, who preferred the Swedish approach to criminalising the purchase of sex. Other dissenting opinions were recorded by the National, ACT, and United Future members.

During the parliamentary debates and committees, support came from some women's rights groups, some human rights groups, and some public health groups. The police were neutral. Some feminists opposed the decriminalisation of brothels and pimping (see feminist views on prostitution); Christian groups were divided; and fundamentalist religious groups, including Right to Life, were opposed.

=== First reading and select committee stage ===
The Prostitution Reform Act was debated for the first time in the House of Representatives on 8 November 2000 as Bill 66-1. The bill passed by a margin of 87 to 21. The bill was then referred to the Justice and Electoral Committee, which received 222 submissions and heard 66 submissions. On 29 November 2002, the committee delivered its report, and amendments in favour of the bill. Following the 2002 election, the bill was referred to as Bill 66-2.

=== Second and third reading ===
On 19 February 2003, the Prostitution Reform Act passed its second reading by a smaller margin of 62 to 56. On 25 June 2003, the Prostitution Reform Act passed its third reading narrowly by a margin of 60 to 59, while one politician, Labour's Ashraf Choudhary, the country's only Muslim MP, abstained. Georgina Beyer, the world's first openly transgender woman MP, delivered an impassioned speech during the debate, identifying herself as a former sex worker and mentioning that she was assaulted while on sex work and was unable to report it to the police. This speech is thought to have swayed the votes of three MPs, including Ashraf Choudhary.

Prostitution Reform Bill – Third Reading
Party	Voted for	Voted against	Abstentions
Labour (52)	41: Rick Barker; Tim Barnett; David Benson-Pope; Georgina Beyer; Mark Burton; Chris Carter; Steve Chadwick; Helen Clark; Michael Cullen; David Cunliffe; Lianne Dalziel; Helen Duncan; Ruth Dyson; Russell Fairbrother; Phil Goff; Mark Gosche; Ann Hartley; George Warren Hawkins; Dave Hereora; Marian Hobbs; Pete Hodgson; Parekura Horomia; Darren Hughes; Jonathan Hunt; Graham Kelly; Annette King; Winnie Laban; Steve Maharey; Trevor Mallard; Mahara Okeroa; David Parker; Mark Peck; Jill Pettis; Lynne Pillay; Mita Ririnui; Jim Sutton; Paul Swain; John Tamihere; Judith Tizard; Tariana Turia; Margaret Wilson	10: Clayton Cosgrove; Harry Duynhoven; Taito Phillip Field; Martin Gallagher; Janet Mackey; Nanaia Mahuta; Damien O'Connor; Ross Robertson; Dover Samuels; Dianne Yates	1: Ashraf Choudhary
National (27)	6: Don Brash; Katherine Rich; Clem Simich; Lockwood Smith; Roger Sowry; Maurice Williamson	21: Shane Ardern; Gerry Brownlee; David Carter; John Carter; Judith Collins; Brian Connell; Bill English; Sandra Goudie; Phil Heatley; Paul Hutchison; John Key; Wayne Mapp; Murray McCully; Simon Power; Tony Ryall; Lynda Scott; Nick Smith; Georgina te Heuheu; Lindsay Tisch; Pansy Wong; Richard Worth	–
NZ First (13)	–	13: Peter Brown; Brent Catchpole; Brian Donnelly; Bill Gudgeon; Dail Jones; Ron Mark; Craig McNair; Pita Paraone; Edwin Perry; Jim Peters; Winston Peters; Barbara Stewart; Doug Woolerton	–
ACT (9)	4: Deborah Coddington; Rodney Hide; Heather Roy; Ken Shirley	5: Donna Awatere Huata; Gerry Eckhoff; Stephen Franks; Muriel Newman; Richard Prebble	–
Green (9)	9: Sue Bradford; Rod Donald; Ian Ewen-Street; Jeanette Fitzsimons; Sue Kedgley; Keith Locke; Nándor Tánczos; Metiria Turei; Mike Ward	–	–
United Future (8)	–	8: Paul Adams; Marc Alexander; Larry Baldock; Gordon Copeland; Peter Dunne; Bernie Ogilvy; Murray Smith; Judy Turner	–
Progressive (2)	–	2: Jim Anderton; Matt Robson	–
Totals	60	59	1

== See also ==
- Prostitution in New Zealand
- Culture of New Zealand
- Untold Intimacies
