= Humbert-Droz =

Humbert-Droz is a surname. Notable people with the surname include:

- Aimé Humbert-Droz, Swiss politician
- Amélie Humbert-Droz, Swiss moral reform activist
- Jules Humbert-Droz, Swiss pastor and communist
- Marie Humbert-Droz, Swiss social purity activist

== See also ==
- Humbert, Germanic masculine given name and surname
- Droz, surname
