= Prostitution in Switzerland =

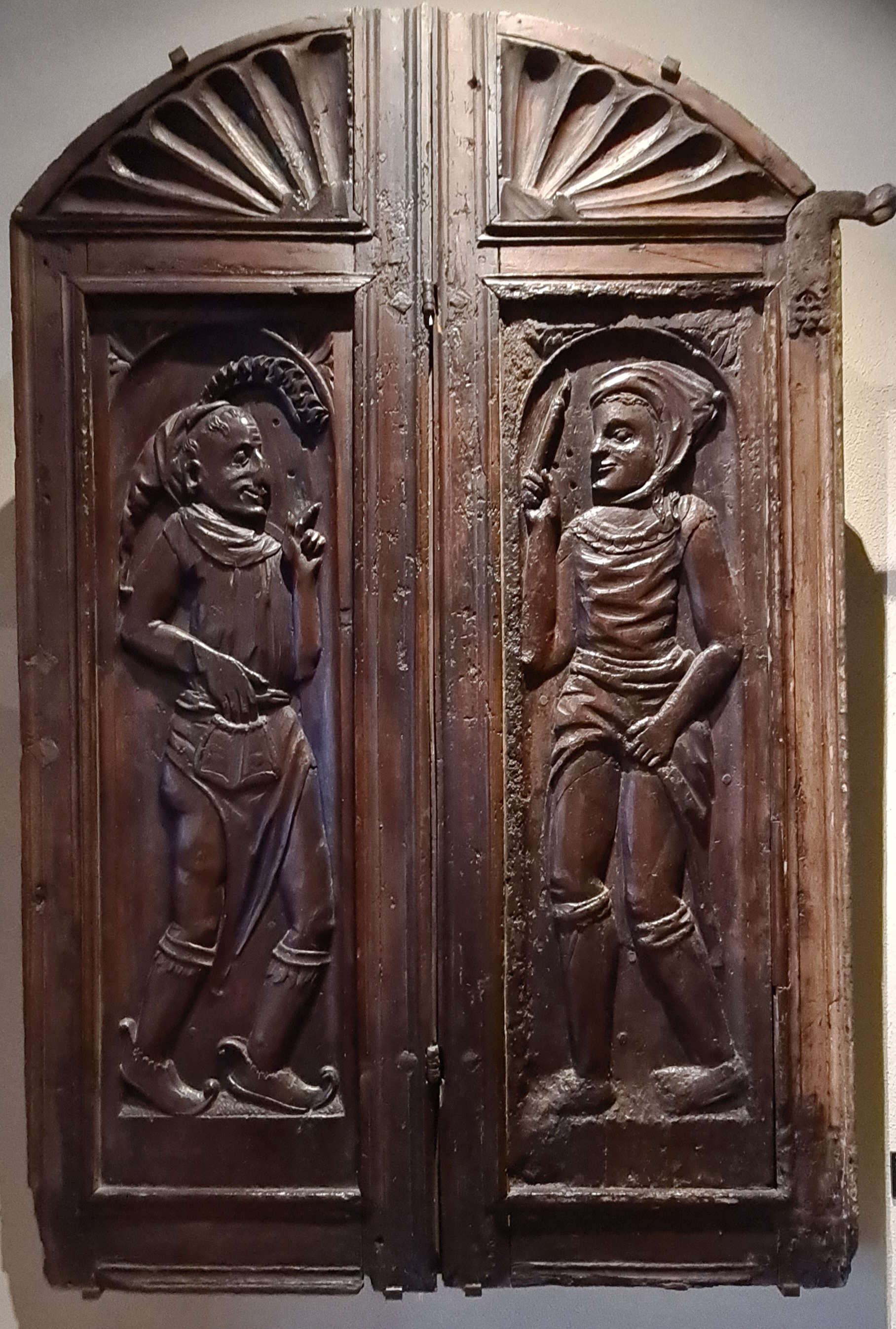
Shutter sign of a brothel in the 15th century in Geneva

Prostitution in Switzerland is legal and regulated; it has been legal since 1942. Trafficking, forcing people into prostitution and most forms of pimping are illegal. Licensed brothels, typically with a reception and leading to several studio apartments, are available. One estimate puts the number of street sex workers in Zurich at 5,000.

UNAIDS estimate there to be 20,000 prostitutes in the country. The majority are foreigners from the Americas, Central Europe or the Far East. In recent years the number of full service sex workers has increased. Many workers operate using newspaper advertisements, mobile phones and secondary rented apartments, some accept credit cards.

== History ==
Prostitution in Switzerland was banned from the Protestant reformation in the 16th century until the Revue pénale suisse of 1889, when a regulation system of authorized brothels were formally tolerated in some of the cities, such as Bern, Zurich and Geneva, in order to prevent the spread of sexual diseases.

Switzerland was managed by local laws and the regulation system was used in specific cities for different time periods, several of which had introduced the system before it was recognized as a fact in 1889. The French regulation system of maisons de tolérance was introduced in Geneva in the early 19th century, in the 1840s in Zurich, and in 1873 in Lugano.

In the 1880s, the international campaign by Josephine Butler influenced a Swiss campaign by Christian moralists against the regulation system in the Swiss cities, and the system was abolished in Lugano in 1886, in Zurich in 1897 and in Lausanne in 1899; Bern followed in 1900. Between 1925 and 1942, prostitution was banned in Switzerland.

In Switzerland, prostitution has been legal since 1942. In 1992, the sexual criminal law was revised, since then pimping and passive soliciting are no longer punishable. The Agreement on the Free Movement of Persons between Switzerland and the EU of 21 June 1999, which was extended to Romania and Bulgaria in 2009, resulted in an increase in the number of prostitutes in the country.

In 2013, "sex boxes" were erected in the Altstetten district of Zurich (such as Strichplatz Depotweg) and one street where street prostitution was allowed was closed. In the same year, street prostitutes in Zurich had to buy nightly permits from a vending machine installed in the area at a cost of 5 francs.

In January 2014, it was publicly announced that inmates of La Pâquerette, a social therapy department for prisoners, were allowed to visit prostitutes in the Champ-Dollon detention center near Geneva, accompanied by social therapists.

== Legal situation ==
As well as Federal law, individual Cantons may also make additional provisions in the form of legislation or regulations.

Street prostitution is illegal, except in specially designated areas in the major cities.

Article 182 of the Swiss Criminal Code is designed to combat human trafficking, Article 195 limits the power pimps can have over prostitutes. Swiss prostitutes are self-employed: regular employment requirements such as when and where to work would make the employer likely to be in breach of article 195.

It is legal to advertise for "massages" in Swiss tabloid newspapers.

Swiss sex workers are subject to taxation and social insurance contributions.

Foreigners sex worker from the European Union can obtain permission to work for 90 days as a prostitute if they present themselves to the city authorities, undergo a police interview, and provide proof of a health insurance plan.

Full service sex work is only legal if the seller is over 18 years of age, and it is a criminal act to pay for sex with anyone who is under 18 years old. This age was raised from 16 (the country's age of sexual consent) in 2013 to bring the country in line with a Council of Europe treaty signed in 2010. The maximum sentence for those who pay for sex with 16-year-old or 17-year-old prostitutes is three years in prison. The maximum sentence for pimping anyone under 18 is ten years in prison. (see Article 195 of the Criminal Code of Switzerland).

=== COVID-19 pandemic ===
As part of the measures to combat the COVID-19 pandemic in Switzerland, prostitution was temporarily banned by the Federal Council under Chapter 3, article 6 of the Ordinance on Measures to Combat the Coronavirus (COVID-19). On 24 March a Thai woman was arrested in Rheineck for not closing her establishment and was subsequently fined 1,500 Swiss francs.

== Sex boxes ==
The local authorities in Zurich installed carport-like constructions called Verrichtungsboxen or 'sex boxes' to protect street based sex workers. In 2012, voters approved the creation of "sex boxes" in Zurich to control suburban sex work. These were described as a "success" by local authorities after a year. The measure has been criticised by several organisations as restrictive.

== Red-light districts ==
There are red-light districts in most of the major Swiss cities: Zurich (Langstrasse); Bern (Lorraine); Geneva (Les Pâquis, Pâquis’ four sex centres - the only places in Geneva where the women sit behind windows); Lausanne (Sevelin); Basel (Kleinbasel). In the early 2000s, Lugano dismantled its "red-light "triangle leaving only Pazzallo with active venues.

== Sex trafficking ==
Switzerland is primarily a destination and, to a lesser extent, a transit country for women, children, and transgender people subjected to sex trafficking. Foreign trafficking victims originate primarily from Central and Eastern Europe—particularly Romania, Hungary, and Bulgaria, with increasing numbers from Nigeria and Thailand. Victims also come from China, Brazil, Cameroon, and the Dominican Republic. The number of victims among asylum-seekers continues to grow. Female victims among asylum-seekers came from Nigeria, Eritrea, and Ethiopia, and were often forced into prostitution. Male victims among asylum-seekers came primarily from Eritrea and Afghanistan and were exploited in prostitution.

The United States Department of State Office to Monitor and Combat Trafficking in Persons ranks Switzerland as a 'Tier 2' country in 2021.

== See also ==
- Prostitution in Europe
- Prostitution by country
- Prostitution law
