= Felice (disambiguation) =

Felice is a given name. Felice may also refer to:

- Felice (surname)
- Félix Romano (1894–1970), also known as Felice, Argentine-born footballer for both France and Italy
- Tropical Storm Felice (1970)
- Felice (Tu Ridi), one of two segments of the 1998 Italian film You Laugh

== See also ==
- Felice...Felice..., a 1998 Dutch drama film directed by Peter Delpeut
- Acqua Felice, an aqueduct of Rome completed in 1586
- Campo Felice, a karstic plateau in the central Apennines
- Porta Felice, a monumental city gate of Palermo
- Castel Felice, a SITMAR (Società Italiana Trasporti Marittima) Line liner
- De Felice, a surname
- DiFelice, a surname
- San Felice (disambiguation)
