= Palazzo De Felice (disambiguation) =

Palazzo De Felice is a fortified baroque palace built into a medieval castle in Rosciano, Province of Pescara (Abruzzo).

Palazzo De Felice may also refer to:

- Palazzo De Felice, Grottaglie, a palace in Grottaglie, Province of Taranto, in Apulia.
- Palazzo De Felice, Somma Vesuviana, a palace in Somma Vesuviana, Province of Napoli, in Campania.
