= Felice (surname) =

Felice is a surname. Notable people with the surname include:

- Cynthia Felice (born 1942), an American science fiction author
- Danny Felice, a Gibraltarian guitarist
- Fortunato Felice (1723–1789), an Italian nobleman and polymath
- Frank Felice (born 1961), an American composer
- Giovanni Felice (1899–1977), a Maltese politician
- Jacqueline Felice de Almania, a 14th-century Italian woman physician
- Leonel Felice (born 1983), an Argentine footballer
- Nicholas Felice (born 1927), an American politician
- Simone Felice, a 17th-century Italian engraver
- Anna Felice, a Maltese judge

== See also ==
- Felice (disambiguation)
- Filice (surname)
- Felice
- De Felice
