= Historical Dictionary of Switzerland =

Encyclopedia on the history of Switzerland

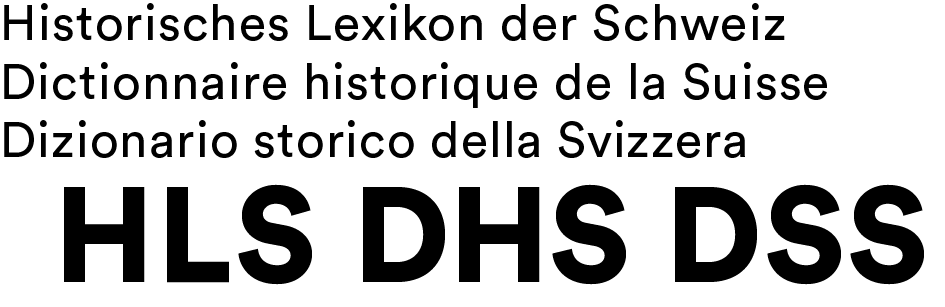
- Available in: German, French, Italian, Romansh
- Owners: Swiss Academy of Humanities and Social Sciences
- Website: hls-dhs-dss.ch (de/fr/it) e-lir.ch (rm)
- Registration: No
- Launched: 1998; 28 years ago

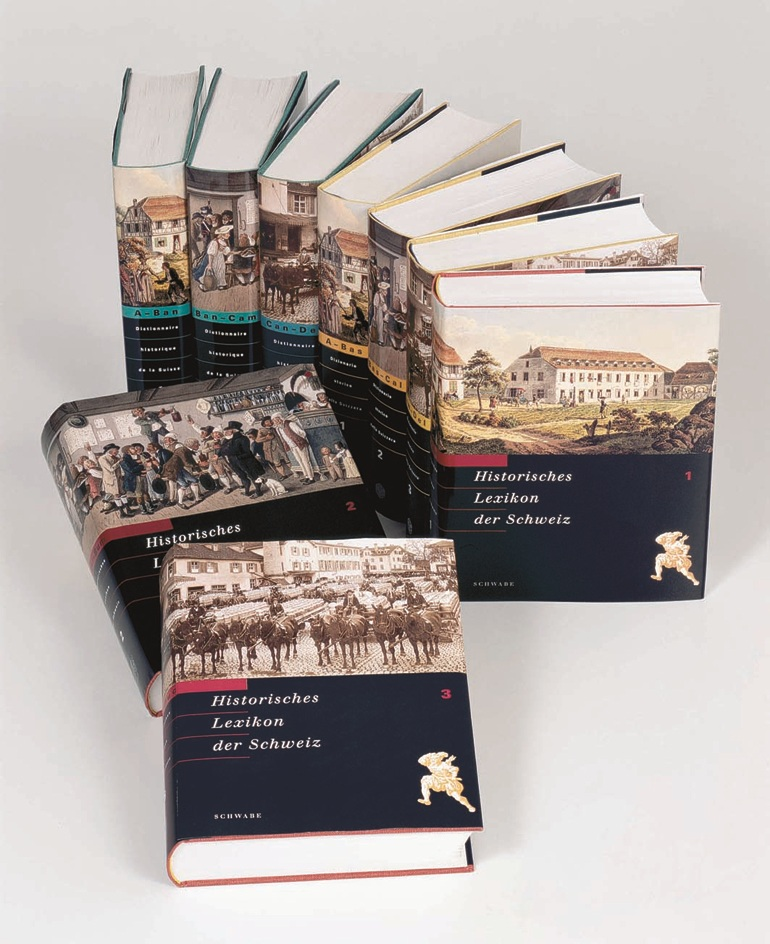
The first three printed volumes, in German, French and Italian

The Historical Dictionary of Switzerland (Dictionnaire historique de la Suisse; abbr. DHS) is an encyclopedia on the history of Switzerland. It aims to present the history of Switzerland in the form of an encyclopaedia, published both on paper and on the internet, in three of the country's national languages: German, French and Italian. When it was completed at the end of 2014, the paper version contained around 36,000 articles divided into thirteen volumes. At the same time, a reduced edition of the dictionary has been published in Romansh under the title Lexicon istoric retic (LIR), and constitutes the first specialist dictionary in the Rhaeto-Romance, Switzerland.

The encyclopedia is published by a foundation under the patronage of the Swiss Academy of Humanities and Social Sciences (SAGW/ASSH) and the Swiss Historical Society (SGG-SHH) and is financed by national research grants.

== History of the project ==
=== A tradition of historical dictionaries ===
Since the time of the illustrated chronicles of Diebold Schilling the Elder in the fifteenth century, numerous historical works have appeared in Switzerland: the Chronicon Helveticum by Aegidius Tschudi (1569) contains around a thousand documents, the twenty volumes of the encyclopaedic dictionary Allgemeines Helvetisches, Eydgenössisches, Oder Schweitzerisches Lexicon (General Helvetic, Federal or Swiss Lexicon) were written by Zurich banker and politician Johann Jacob Leu between 1747 and 1765. followed by the Dictionnaire géographique et statistique de la Suisse (Geographical and Statistical Dictionary of Switzerland) by Markus Lutz.

The last Swiss historical dictionary to appear between the two world wars was the Dictionnaire historique et biographique de la Suisse (DHBS, Historical & Biographical Dictionary of Switzerland), published in seven volumes between 1921 and 1934. Edited by Victor Attinger from Neuchâtel, it was a financial failure, mainly because of the lack of supervision of the authors, who were largely recruited by the cantonal archivists associated with the project.

=== Genesis of the project ===
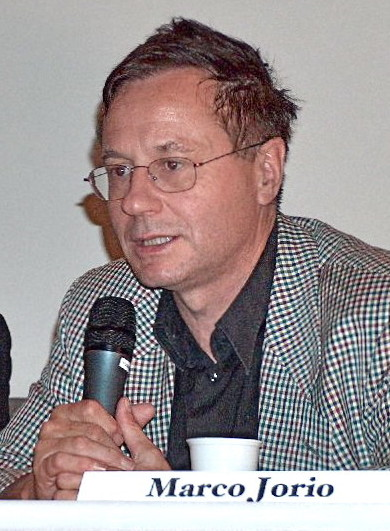
Marco Jorio, editor-in-chief of the DHS

As early as the 1950s, several personal initiatives - including those of Federal Councillors Philipp Etter in 1958 and Hans Peter Tschudi a few years later - were launched with the aim of creating a successor to the DHBS, whose financial failure, which had by then caused the bankruptcy of its publishing company, was holding back various publishers and historians from embarking on a new adventure, according to historian Marco Jorio, editor-in-chief of DHS, quoted by newspaper Le Temps. However, the idea was taken up by two publishers in the early 1980s, and in 1983 the Swiss Academy of Humanities and Social Sciences (ASSH) commissioned two professors, Carl Pfaff from the University of Fribourg and Alain Dubois from the University of Lausanne. Together with the archivist of the Canton of Lucerne , they initiated the DHS project, which was soon supported by the Swiss Historical Society.

In 1987, the Federal Assembly approved funds to launch the project, as part of the celebrations marking the 700th anniversary of the Swiss Confederation in 1991, and in parallel with several historical or historiographical publications, such as the six-volume Schweizer Lexikon (Swiss Lexicon). The following year, the "Foundation Historical Dictionary of Switzerland" was created, with the dual aim of publishing a multi-volume historical dictionary that would reflect recent historical research while remaining accessible to a wide audience, and of publishing this dictionary in the form of an electronic database.

== Versions ==
=== Online edition ===
On 4 September 1998, the first 8,000 articles (equivalent to three volumes) of the online edition were presented in three languages to the media in Berne. This free launch had been preceded by the creation of an online prototype in August 1997, accessible only to Foundation staff. Such was the success of this online prototype that the Foundation Board decided, in autumn 1997, not to release the first paper volume in 1998 as planned, but to change the sequence of publications and start with the website before publishing the first book. This decision also meant that articles already written could be made available more quickly, without the need for alphabetical order.

In 2002, the site had 11300 entries available in at least one of the three languages. The site, which is deliberately sober and devoid of illustrations, cost almost 10000 francs to create and is updated every four weeks. Due to lack of funds, the idea of producing a CD-ROM was abandoned, while the development of a keyword search engine was delayed. After the website went online, work on the paper version of the encyclopedia resumed. On 14 June 1999, a new contract was signed with the Schwabe publishing house to compensate for the departure of two of the three publishers involved in the project, following a change in their editorial line. This announcement of collaboration, coupled with a 500,000-franc subsidy from the Federal Council to cover the printing costs of the first ten volumes, meant that the first volume could be released in 2002, despite criticism that the paper version was being abandoned in favor of the online version.

Finally, on 31 October 2002, the first of the planned twelve volumes was officially presented in German ("Historisches Lexikon der Schweiz" and published by Schwabe), French (published by Gilles Attinger in Hauterive) and Italian ("Dizionario storico della Svizzera" and published by Armando Dadò in Locarno) at a ceremony held at the Swiss National Library and presided over by Jean Guinand, President of the Foundation, and Ruth Dreifuss, Federal Councillor for Culture. Subsequent volumes are published at the rate of one per year, and are released every autumn.

=== Print edition ===
The encyclopedia is published simultaneously in three of Switzerland's national languages: German (Historisches Lexikon der Schweiz, HLS, in red), French (Dictionnaire Historique de la Suisse, DHS, in blue) and Italian (Dizionario Storico della Svizzera, DSS, in yellow). The first of a total of 13 volumes was published in 2002 and the final volume was in 2014. All volumes are available in German, French and Italian, and an abbreviated version in 2 volumes (3100 articles) is available in Romansh (Lexicon Istoric Retic).

The 36,000 headings are grouped in:

1. Biographies (35%)
2. Articles on families and genealogy (10%)
3. Articles on places (municipalities, cantons, other nation states, fortresses, signories, abbeys, archeological sites) (30%)
4. Subject articles (historical phenomena and terms, institutions, events) (25%)

=== Lexicon Istoric Retic ===
A reduced edition of the dictionary was also published in Romansh with the title Lexicon Istoric Retic (LIR), the first specialized dictionary of Rhaeto-Romanic Switzerland. Its aim was "to present, as comprehensively as possible, the historical and cultural development of the Rhaetian and Graubünden area, i.e. the present trilingual canton of Grisons and some neighbouring regions". The printed dictionary comprises 3,200 articles on regional biographies, places and events; the first volume appeared at the end of 2010, the second in 2012 :

- Abundi à Luzzi (in Romansh). Vol. 1. Cuira: Chasa editura Desertina. 2010. ISBN 978-3-85637-390-0.
- Macdonald à Zwingli (in Romansh). Vol. 2. Cuira: Chasa editura Desertina. 2012. ISBN 978-3-85637-391-7.

The e-LIR website has been online since 2004. According to those responsible for the site, it is the first dictionary in the world where editorial work is carried out directly on the Internet.

== Organisation ==
The staff who produced the dictionary fall into two categories: the forty or so employees of the foundation in Berne or at the Bellinzona and Chur branches, the freelance collaborators who include 75 translators, a hundred or so advisors working at various Swiss and foreign universities, as well as in archives throughout the country, and above all almost 2,500 authors.

Marco Jorio headed the company from 1988 to 2014. The company is organized into four language departments, an iconography department, an IT department and an administrative department responsible for secretarial and accounting tasks. This organization is mandated by the DHS Foundation, which in turn is governed by a Foundation Board comprising a maximum of thirteen members, appointed by the Swiss Historical Society, the ASSH, the Swiss Confederation, the Swiss National Science Foundation and the Association of Swiss Archivists. Presidents of the Foundation Board have been Georges-André Chevallaz from 1988 to 1992, Ernst Rüesch from 1993 to 1996, Jean Guinand from 1997 to 2004, Peter Schmid from 2005 to 2010 and Martine Brunschwig Graf from 2011 to 2016.

On 1 January 2017, the DHS Foundation completed its work and passed the baton to the ASSH.

== Editorial choices ==
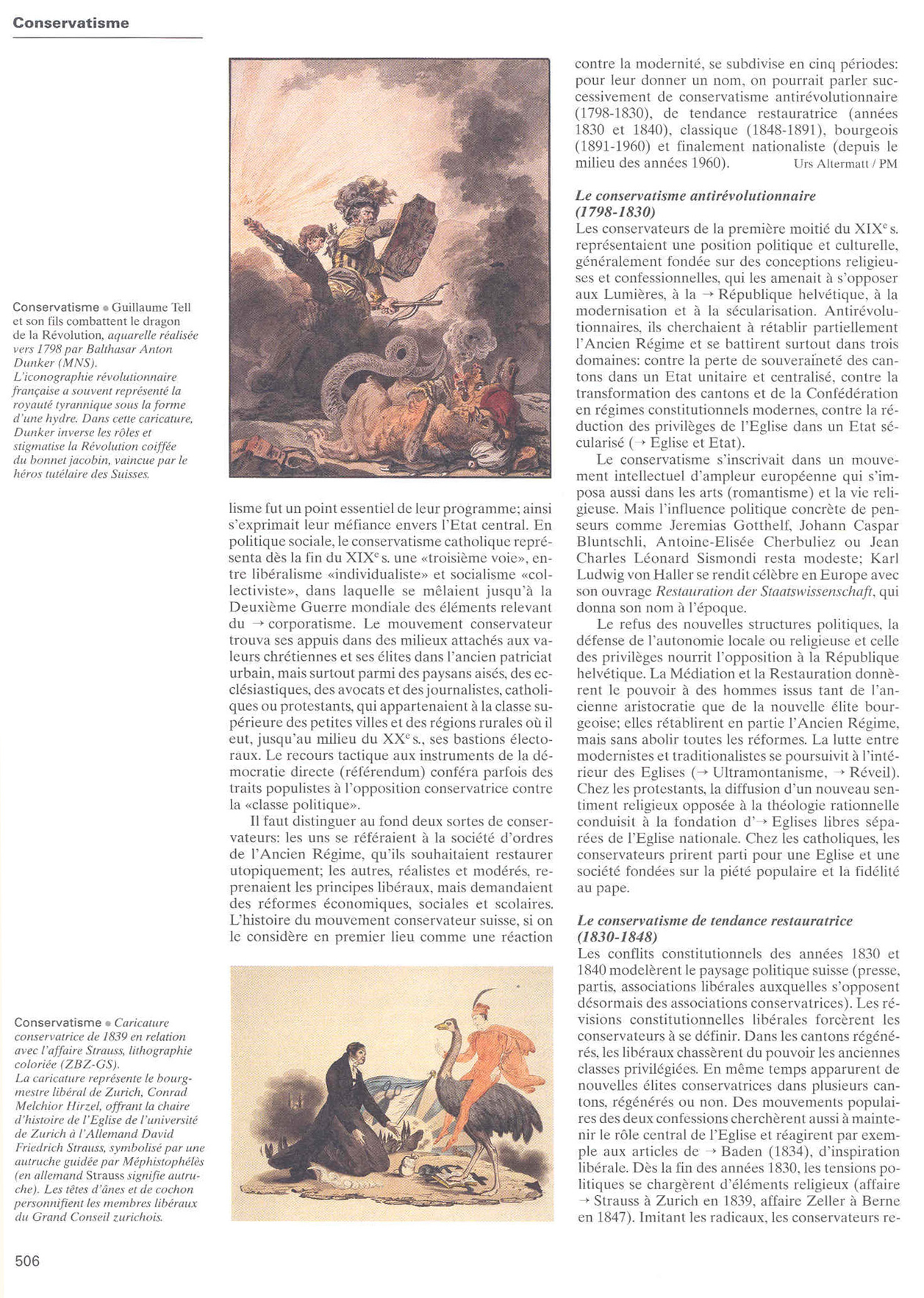
Example of one page (French version, volume 3, page 506)

While the contents of the DHS cover all historical periods in present-day Switzerland, greater importance is given to certain periods, depending on the historical material available: for example, 10% of the articles cover the period from the Palaeolithic to the Early Middle Ages, while 20% cover the period between the World War I and the end of the 20th century.

Before writing the first article, the complete list of entries was defined on the basis of criteria defined in advance. The 36,000 articles fall into four categories: biographies, which account for 35% of the total number of articles; families and genealogy, which make up around 10%; geography (including communes, cantons, bailliages or archaeological sites), which accounts for almost a third of the total; the remaining 25% or so are divided into various themes, such as historical phenomena and concepts, or institutions.

The size of the articles is not fixed and varies, depending on the subject, from a few lines to several pages. The articles in the thirteen volumes are illustrated with historical images from museums, print cabinets and archives, accompanied by captions, maps and charts. These images were collected and captioned by Pierre Chessex and Werner Bosshard from 1990 to 2014. The illustrations are reproduced in the electronic DHS. The writing of the articles, the inputting of the list of entries and the management of the project itself all make extensive use of computer support. As early as 1992, texts were entered in a Standard Generalized Markup Language compliant format. This enabled automatic conversion into the HTML format used for web pages.

== Print editions ==
=== In German ===
- Historisches Lexikon der Schweiz. Aa - Basel (Fürstbistum). Vol. 1. Basel: Schwabe. 2002. ISBN 978-3-7965-1901-7.
- Historisches Lexikon der Schweiz. Basel (Kanton) - Bümpliz. Vol. 2. Basel: Schwabe. 2003. ISBN 978-3-7965-1902-4.
- Historisches Lexikon der Schweiz. Bund - Ducros. Vol. 3. Schwabe. 2004. ISBN 978-3-7965-1903-1.
- Historisches Lexikon der Schweiz. Dudan - Frowin. Vol. 4. Basel: Schwabe. 2005. ISBN 978-3-7965-1904-8.
- Historisches Lexikon der Schweiz. Fruchtbarkeit - Gyssling. Vol. 5. Basel: Schwabe. 2006. ISBN 978-3-7965-1905-5.
- Historisches Lexikon der Schweiz. Haab - Juon. Vol. 6. Basel: Schwabe. 2007. ISBN 978-3-7965-1906-2.
- Historisches Lexikon der Schweiz. Jura - Lobsigen. Vol. 7. Basel: Schwabe. 2008. ISBN 978-3-7965-1907-9.
- Historisches Lexikon der Schweiz. Locarnini - Muoth. Vol. 8. Basel: Schwabe. 2009. ISBN 978-3-7965-1908-6.
- Historisches Lexikon der Schweiz Mur - Privilegien. Vol. 9. Basel: Schwabe. 2010. ISBN 978-3-7965-1909-3.
- Historisches Lexikon der Schweiz. Pro - Schafroth. Vol. 10. Basel: Schwabe. 2011. ISBN 978-3-7965-1910-9.
- Historisches Lexikon der Schweiz. Schaichet - StGB. Vol. 11. Basel: Schwabe. 2012. ISBN 978-3-7965-1911-6.
- Historisches Lexikon der Schweiz. Stich - Vinzenz Ferrer / Chefred.: Marco Jorio / Chefred.: Marco Jorio. Vol. 12. Basel: Schwabe. 2013. ISBN 978-3-7965-1912-3.
- Historisches Lexikon der Schweiz. Viol - Zyro. Vol. 13. Basel: Schwabe. 2014. ISBN 978-3-7965-1913-0.

=== In French ===
- Aa-Ban de l'Empire (in French). Vol. 1. Hauterive: Éditions Gilles Attinger. 2002. ISBN 2-88256-134-2.
- Bandelier-Camuzzi (in French). Vol. 2. Hauterive: Éditions Gilles Attinger. 2003. ISBN 2-88256-143-1.
- Canada - Derville-Maléchard (in French). Vol. 3. Hauterive: Éditions Gilles Attinger. 2004. ISBN 2-88256-153-9.
- Desaix - Fintan (in French). Vol. 4. Hauterive: Éditions Gilles Attinger. 2005. ISBN 2-88256-157-1.
- Firl - Grize (in French). Vol. 5. Hauterive: Éditions Gilles Attinger. 2006. ISBN 2-88256-167-9.
- Grob - Istighofen (in French). Vol. 6. Hauterive: Éditions Gilles Attinger. 2007. ISBN 978-2-88256-180-0.
- Italianité - Lozza (in French). Vol. 7. Hauterive: Éditions Gilles Attinger. 2008. ISBN 978-2-88256-197-8.
- Lü - Muoth (in French). Vol. 8. Hauterive: Éditions Gilles Attinger. 2008. ISBN 978-2-940418-06-0.
- Mur - Polytechnicum (in French). Vol. 9. Hauterive: Éditions Gilles Attinger. 2008. ISBN 978-2-940418-18-3.
- Poma - Saitzew (in French). Vol. 10. Hauterive: Éditions Gilles Attinger. 2008. ISBN 978-2-940418-31-2.
- Sal - Stadtmann (in French). Vol. 11. Hauterive: Éditions Gilles Attinger. 2008. ISBN 978-2-940418-38-1.
- Staechelin - Valier (in French). Vol. 12. Hauterive: Éditions Gilles Attinger. 2008. ISBN 978-2-940418-39-8.
- Valkenier - Zyro (in French). Vol. 13. Hauterive: Éditions Gilles Attinger. 2008. ISBN 978-2-940418-40-4.

=== In Italian ===
- Aa - Basilea, Fadrique de (in Italian). Vol. 1. Locarno: Armando Dadò. 2002. ISBN 88-8281-099-2.
- Basilea (cantone) - Calvino (in Italian). Vol. 2. Locarno: Armando Dadò. 2003. ISBN 88-8281-125-5.
- Cama - Delz (in Italian). Vol. 3. Locarno: Armando Dadò. 2004. ISBN 88-8281-150-6.
- De Man - Flury (in Italian). Vol. 4. Locarno: Armando Dadò. 2005. ISBN 88-8281-168-9.
- Fmi - Greyerz (in Italian). Vol. 5. Locarno: Armando Dadò. 2006. ISBN 88-8281-200-6.
- Gribbio - Istruzione pubblica (in Italian). Vol. 6. Locarno: Armando Dadò. 2007. ISBN 978-88-8281-206-5.
- Italia - Lugrin (in Italian). Vol. 7. Locarno: Armando Dadò. 2008. ISBN 978-88-8281-230-0.
- Luigi - Napoli (in Italian). Vol. 8. Locarno: Armando Dadò. 2009. ISBN 978-88-8281-259-1.
- Narbel - Pottu (in Italian). Vol. 9. Locarno: Armando Dadò. 2010. ISBN 978-88-8281-277-5.
- Poulet - Sapun (in Italian). Vol. 10. Locarno: Armando Dadò. 2011. ISBN 978-88-8281-302-4.
- Saraceni - Starrkirchwil (in Italian). Vol. 11. Locarno: Armando Dadò. 2012. ISBN 978-88-8281-336-9.
- Statalismo - Valeyres sous Ursins (in Italian). Vol. 12. Locarno: Armando Dadò. 2013. ISBN 978-88-8281-357-4.
- Valichi - Zyro (in Italian). Vol. 13. Locarno: Armando Dadò. 2014. ISBN 978-88-8281-383-3.
