= Amélie Humbert-Droz =

Swiss moral reform activist (1851–1936)

- Born: 22 May 1851; Neuchâtel, Switzerland
- Died: 13 October 1936 (aged 85); Neuchâtel, Switzerland
- Occupations: Secretary; editor
- Parents: Aimé Humbert-Droz (father); Marie Humbert-Droz (mother)

Amélie Humbert-Droz (22 May 1851 – 13 October 1936) was a Swiss activist in the social purity movement. She was private secretary to Josephine Butler from 1876 to 1885, and later secretary and vice-president of the International Union of Friends of Young Women.

== Biography ==
Title page of a study on the relations between the International Union of Friends of Young Women and the social purity movement, which Humbert-Droz presented in 1895 and which was published the same year in Neuchâtel by Attinger Frères

Amélie Humbert-Droz was the daughter of Aimé Humbert-Droz and Marie Humbert-Droz. She was unmarried. She grew up in Neuchâtel, and in her youth she worked for the Salvation Army.

From 1876 to 1885, as private secretary to Josephine Butler, she took part in the campaign against state-regulated prostitution. She followed her mother into the social purity movement: from 1888 to 1915 she was secretary, and from 1915 to 1925 vice-president, of the International Union of Friends of Young Women (French Union internationale des Amies de la jeune fille), and she edited its journal, Le journal du bien public. She supported women's suffrage as a means of moral reform. She was a member of the Union féministe in Neuchâtel and, from 1878, worked with the Blue Cross. She wrote numerous hymns.

== Bibliography ==
- Le journal du bien public, 10, 1936
- Le Mouvement féministe, 31 October 1936
