= Marie Humbert-Droz =

Swiss social purity activist (1819–1888)

- Born: Marie Müller; 20 July 1819; Stuttgart, Kingdom of Württemberg
- Died: 17 March 1888 (aged 68); Neuchâtel, Switzerland
- Other name: Marie Humbert-Droz-Müller
- Occupations: Governess; editor
- Spouse: Aimé Humbert-Droz (m. 1843)
- Children: Amélie Humbert-Droz

Marie Humbert-Droz (née Müller; 20 July 1819 – 17 March 1888), also Marie Humbert-Droz-Müller, was a Swiss activist in the social purity movement, whose Swiss branch she co-founded. From 1877 to 1888 she was the first president of the International Union of Friends of Young Women.

== Biography ==
Marie Müller was the daughter of Johann Ernst Müller, a theologian, and Julie née Mayer. She grew up in Stuttgart and was taught several languages by her father. From 1839 to 1841 she worked as a governess in the Netherlands. In 1843 she married Aimé Humbert-Droz.

Her acquaintance with Josephine Butler led her to the social purity movement, and she co-founded its Swiss branch. From 1875 she was president of the Comité intercantonal de dames de la Suisse. From 1877 to 1888 she was the first president of the International Union of Friends of Young Women (French Union internationale des Amies de la jeune fille), and she edited its journal, Le journal du bien public. She founded La Ruche, an educational institution for girls in Neuchâtel. Her daughter Amélie Humbert-Droz followed her into the social purity movement.

== Bibliography ==
- Le journal du bien public, 15 April 1888, 28–31
- Schweizer Frauen der Tat, 1, 1929, 250–280
