= San Felices =

San Felices is the Spanish name of Saint Felix of Bilibio (5th century).

It may also refer to:

== Places ==
- San Felices, Soria
- San Felices de Buelna, Cantabria
- San Felices de los Gallegos, Salamanca
- San Felices, Huesca
- San Felices, La Rioja
- San Felices de Ara, Huesca
- San Felices de Castillería, Palencia
- San Felices del Rudrón, Burgos

== Churches ==
- Hermitage of San Felices in Ábalos, La Rioja
- Hermitage of San Felices in Haro, La Rioja
- Hermitage of San Felices in Ortigosa de Cameros
- Hermitage of San Felices in Villafranca Montes de Oca
- Church of San Pedro y San Felices
- Monastery of San Felices de Abia
- Monastery of San Felices de Calatrava

== Other ==
- Marquis of San Felices de Aragón
- Castle of San Felices de los Gallegos

== See also ==
- San Felice (disambiguation)
