= Philip Ruttley =

Anglo–Swiss lawyer (born 1954)

Philip Ruttley (born 1954) is an Anglo-Swiss lawyer and published expert in European Union competition (anti-trust) law and international trade law. He has been described as "one of Europe's foremost maritime competition experts".

== Biography ==
Philip Ruttley (b. Philippe Grin) was born in Zürich in 1954 and is descended from the Huguenot Abolitionist Guillaume de Félice and 18th century philosopher Fortunato de Felice. He is also related to Mme de Staël, the 19th century literary figure, and Henri Guisan, the commander of the Swiss armed forces during WWII. He was educated at Harrow School in London, Oxford University (where he was an entrance History scholar, graduating with first class honours in 1976), University of Florence and City University (where he obtained a diploma in Law). He was called to the English Bar in 1980 (Inner Temple) and admitted as a solicitor in 1992. After practising EC law in London and Brussels, he served as a United Nations legal advisor in Rome, and then as an EC Advisor to the UK Government's Treasury Solicitor's Department.

He has appeared in many cases before the European Court of Justice and has been involved in several WTO dispute settlement proceedings.

In 2008, Ruttley acted for the consumer group "Which?" in the first ever European consumer group action against a cartel. A defendant, JJB Sports agreed to pay compensation for its role in price-fixing, as investigated by the UK Government's Office of Fair Trading. The case resulted in fines of up to £17m for the cartel.

He has published widely on EC and World Trade Organization issues. He was secretary and founder of the European Maritime Law Organization, and was also secretary of the World Trade Law Association from 1997 to 2003.

== Awards ==
- The Times' Lawyer of the Week 2008

== Select bibliography ==
=== Books ===
- The WTO and International Trade Regulation (Cameron May 1998) Co-author and editor with Iain MacVay and Carol George
- The Impact of the WTO on International Trade (Cameron May 1998) Co-author and editor with Iain MacVay
- Liberalisation and Protectionism in the World Trading System (Cameron May 1999) Co-author and editor with Iain MacVay and Ahmad Masa'deh
- Due Process in WTO Dispute Settlement (Cameron May 2001) Co-author and editor with Iain MacVay and Marc Weisberger

=== Contributed chapters ===
- The Idea of Europe: From Antiquity to the European Union (ed Pagden, Cambridge Univ Press, 2002) " The long road to unity: the contribution of law to the process of European integration, 1945–1995"
- The World Trade Organization: Legal, Economic and Political Analysis, (eds Macrory, Appleton and Plummer) Kluwer 2005, chapter on "The WTO Agreement in European Community Law: status, effect and enforcement" with Marc Weisberger
- Bernstein's Handbook of Arbitration and Dispute Resolution Practice (4th ed), Sweet & Maxwell, [2003] chapter on Dispute Resolution in WTO law
- A Handbook of World Trade: ICC, 2004 chapters on "Anti-dumping regulations and practices" (with particular reference to EU law), 105, "Mechanism for regulating environmental Barriers to Trade within the WTO" (with Marc Weisberger and Fiona Mucklow), "Resolving trade disputes in the WTO" (with Marc Weisberger), "Private party enforcement of WTO law in the EC legal context" (with Marc Weisberger)
- Shawcross & Beaumont: Air Law (multi-author survey): co-editor with Solange Leandro, of Division X: "Competition/EU" (2012)

=== Articles ===
- Classification of Goods under the EEC Common Customs Tariff, New Law Journal, [1985] 181
- International Shipping and EEC Competition Law [1991] European Competition Law Review, 5
- The Consortia Block Exemption European Transport Law Review [1993], 487
- Les transports multimodaux à l'épreuve des règles communautaires de la concurrence Le Droit Maritime Français, [1995], 868
- Les accords de consortia: le nouveau régime communautaire, Journal de la Marine Marchande [1995], p. 1857
- Seaports and EC law: a survey of current developments European Transport Law Review, [1995] 821
- EC Competition Law and Shipping Lloyd's Shipping Economist, 1995
- Aspects juridiques de la concurrence maritime par Garifalia Athanassiou (review article in Le Droit Maritime Français, [1996], 575
- EC Competition Law in Cyberspace: an overview of recent developments, European Competition Law Review [1998] 186
- A new regime for International Financial Services: the WTO Agreement on Financial Services Journal of International Banking Law, [1998] 22
- The direct effect of WTO Agreements in EC Law, International Trade Law Quarterly, [1998], 5
- The WTO Financial Services Agreement Journal of International Financial Markets, [1999] 109
- Liner Conferences: a survey of recent developments in EC competition law, Il Diritto Marittimo [2000 79]
- Law on troubled waters: recent developments in EC maritime competition law, Shipping & Transport Lawyer, [2003] 31
- Stormy Skies Ahead: The New EC Regulation Against Unfair Pricing in the Aviation Sector International Trade Law and Regulation [2005], 33
