= Lucie Attinger =

Swiss painter and illustrator

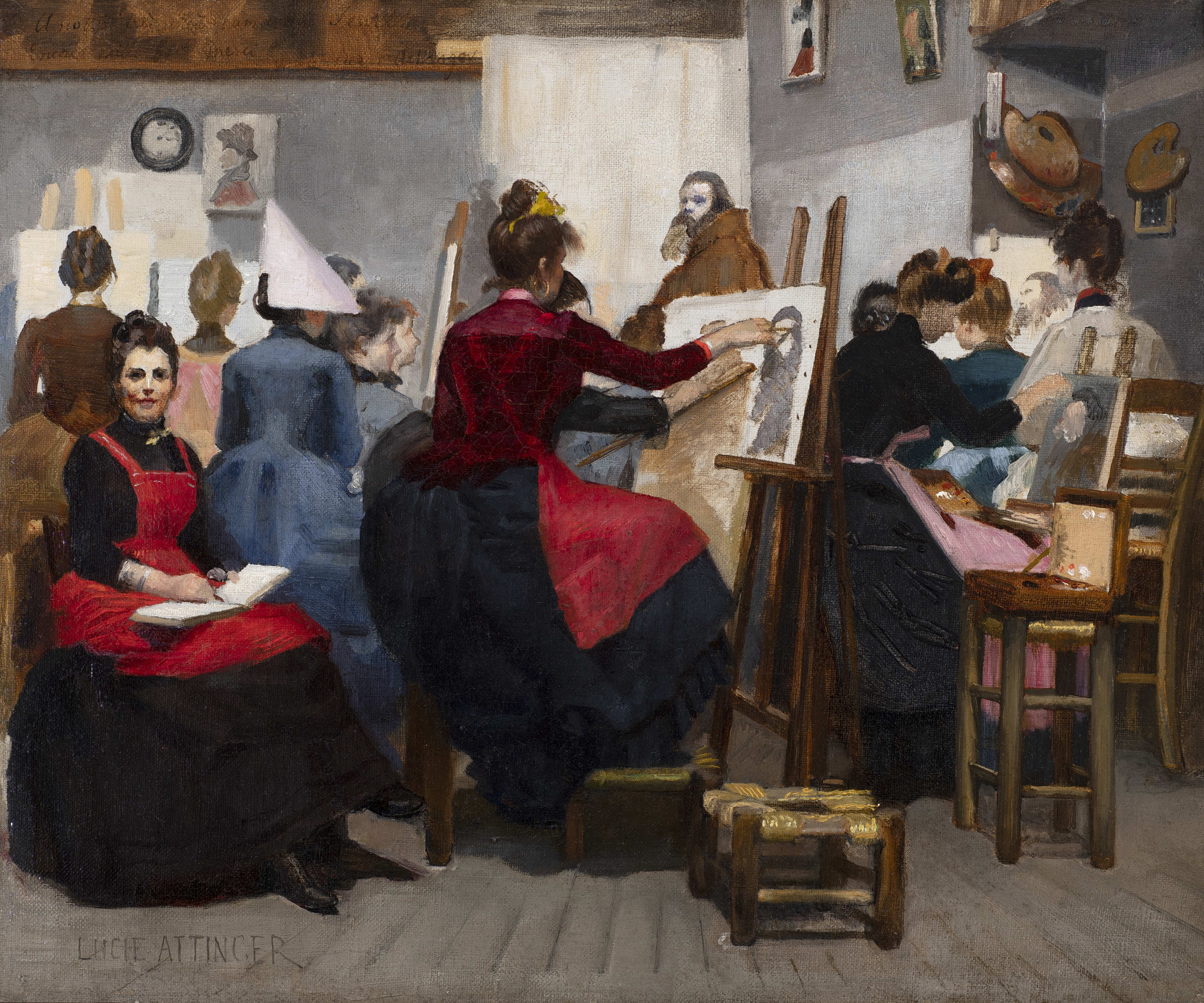
- Mon Atelier (1889) includes a self-portrait of Lucie Attinger on the left.
- Born: 1 March 1859
- Died: 10 June 1928
- Occupations: Illustrator, painter

Lucie-Charlotte Attinger (1 March 1859 – 10 June 1928) was a Swiss painter and illustrator.

Lucie Attinger was born on 1 March 1859 in Neuchâtel, Switzerland, one of eight children of James Attinger (1818-1885), son of the founder of the Attinger publishing house. In Neuchâtel she studied art under Georges Grisel and Auguste Bachelin, then attended the Académie Julian in Paris.

At the Paris Salon of 1889, she exhibited her painting Mon Atelier ("My Studio"), which depicts a life class at the Académie Julian. It is one of only two known paintings (the other being Marie Bashkertseff’s In the Studio) to depicts such a class at the Académie. Mon Atelier includes a self-portrait of Attinger sketching the viewer of the painting.

In 1893, Attinger married Henri Busquet de Caument (1859-1937), a member of a French aristocratic family whom she met at a showing of her work. They had two daughters.

Attinger illustrated a number of prints for Imagerie Quantin, in the style of Épinal prints. In the 1890s she was an illustrator for a number of French magazines: La France illustrée, Le J.Amusant (under the name Nell), L'Éclipseand La Gandriole (both under the name Jattin).She also illustrated a number of books: Chansons des nos Grand'mères (1889) by Alfred Godet, Quatre petites filles heureuses (1892) by Lucie Achard, as well as Contes choisis (1893) and Alte Volks- und Kinderlieder (1910) by Christoph von Schmid.

Lucie Attinger died in Neuilly-sur-Seine on 10 June 1928.
