= Grottaglie =

Grottaglie li Vurtàgghie (Sicilian)
- Comune
- Comune di Grottaglie
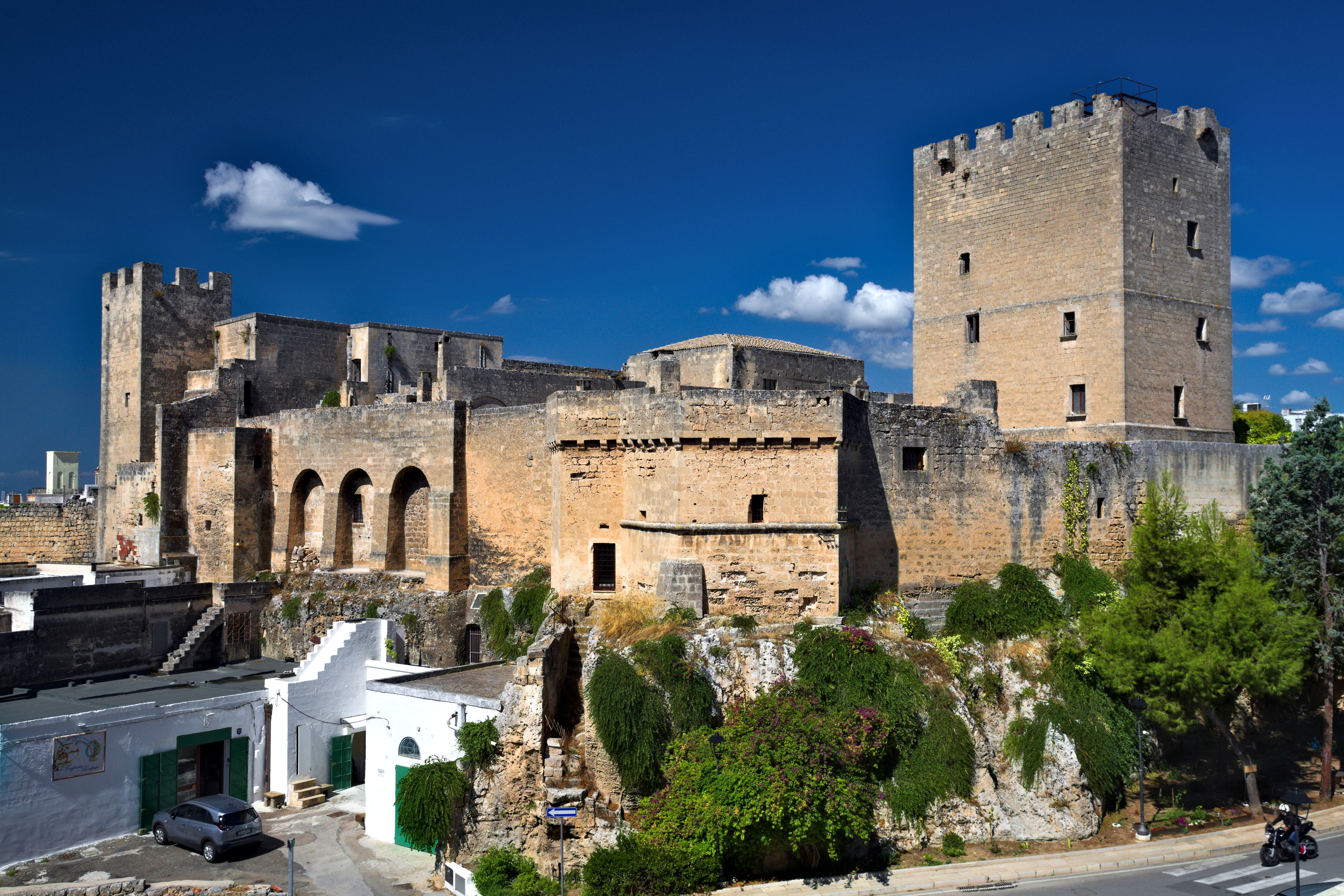
- Castello Episcopio and the pottery district

- Coat of arms

- Location in Taranto Province

- Location within Italy Location within Apulia
- Coordinates: 40°32′N 17°26′E
- Country: Italy
- Region: Apulia
- Province: Taranto (TA)
- Frazioni: Carraro delle Vacche, Paparazio

Government
  - Mayor: Ciro D'Alò (Lista civica Grottaglie ON)

Area
  - Total: 102.12 km^{2} (39.43 sq mi)
- Elevation: 133 m (436 ft)

Population (December 31, 2023)
  - Total: 30,472
  - Density: 298.39/km^{2} (772.84/sq mi)
- Demonym: Grottagliesi
- Time zone: UTC+1 (CET)
  - Summer (DST): UTC+2 (CEST)
- Postal code: 74023
- Dialing code: 099
- Patron saint: St. Francis of Geronimo, St. Cyrus
- Saint day: January 31
- Website: Official website

Grottaglie (Italian: [ɡrotˈtaʎʎe]; Salentino: li Vurtàgghie; Latin: Criptalium) is a town and comune (municipality) in the province of Taranto, Apulia, in southern Italy.

== Geography ==
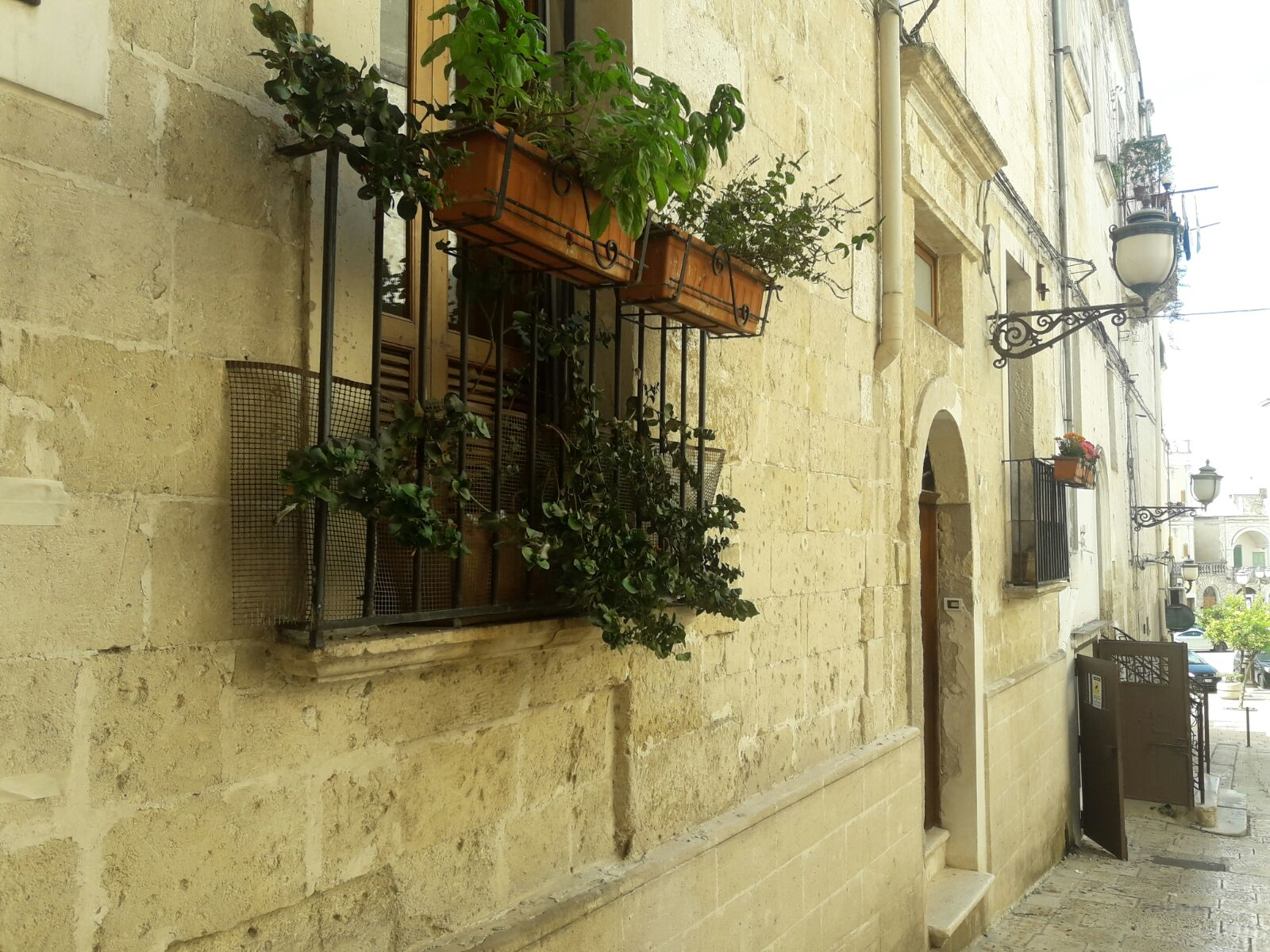
Building in the historical center

Grottaglie is located in the Salento peninsula, dividing the Adriatic Sea from Ionian Sea. The countryside around the city is scattered with vast and deep ravines in the limestone that underlies the peninsula. The urban core of Grottaglie is surrounded by these ravines.

== History ==
There is evidence of settlement in the region since the Paleolithic era. The name Grottaglie derives from the Latin Cryptae Aliae, meaning "many ravines". The ancestral part of the town was one of the citadels in the area, referred to in Medieval documents as Casale Cryptalerum, founded by locals sheltering in the caves of the ravines due to coastal Saracen raids.

The fief of Grottaglie was donated by the Norman overlords to the archbishopric of Taranto in the 11th century. In the 14th century the ecclesiastic administration provided the fief with fortifications, walls, a fortress known as the Archbishop's Castle (Italian: Castello Episcopio) as well as with the Chiesa Matrice ("Mother church").

Since the 15th-17th centuries the jurisdiction over Grottaglie fief was split between the ecclesiastic administration (civil law) and the lay feudal lords (criminal law, Cicinelli-Caracciolo family). Fights between these two competing authorities and periodic revolts by the heavily-taxed population were the leit-motiv of Grottaglie's history until the abolition of feudalism in 1806. After the Italian unification, Grottaglie had the first urban expansion outside its Medieval walls.

== Main sights ==
- Castello Episcopio, massive 13th-century castle
- Chiesa Matrice, main church of the town, built in 1379
- Oratory of the Confraternity of the Purgatory
- Palazzo Cicinelli, a massive Baroque style building on the main square; the palazzo was the seat of the Dukes of Grottaglie also princes of Cursi and Princes of the Holy Roman Empire, hence the residence of the feudal lords of the town on the grant of Bohemond of Taranto.
- Palazzo Urselli, which maintains the original Renaissance (pre-Baroque) façade, with a massive 15th century gate and a decorated internal courtyard.
- Palazzo Blasi dates back to the XVII century. It has a Baroque façade, although there are many elements added later to the original building.
- Palazzo Maggiulli-Cometa, a structure similar to Palazzo Urselli's
- Palazzo de Felice, 18th-century palace and ancestral home of the de Felice family
- San Francesco di Paola, baroque monastery, a masterpiece of architecture with a cloiste
- Chiesa del Carmine, housing a 1530 stone nativity scene sculpted by Stefano da Putignano

== Culture ==
Folkloristic and religious events include the commemoration-day of St. Cyrus and Easter-period when the Medieval-rooted confraternal religious orders perform their processions during the days of the Holy Week (Easter rituals include procession and pilgrimage of confrères called “Bubble-Bubble” (Italian: BBubbli BBubbli) through the streets of country).

Other events include:

- The exhibition Ceramica nel Quartiere delle Ceramiche
- The Mediterranean ceramics contest, theatrical and musical events
- Promotion of dessert grapes, months of July, August, and September
- Exhibition - contest about ceramic crib scene during the months of December and January
- Musica Mundi – international festival of ethnic music in July

== Economy ==
Grapes and ceramics-industry are two traditional elements of the local economy since the times of Greater Greece.

The numerous ceramic finds, tracing back to the Classical Age and kept in the National Museum of "Magna Grecia" in Taranto, reveal the antique roots of this handicrafts production which was privileged by the presence of considerable amounts of clay in the surrounding territory. More recently, records dating back to the 18th century report at the time 42 companies in Grottaglie operating in the ceramics-sector with a total of 5,000 employees. In addition to ceramics, also agricultural products such as olive oil and excellent choice dessert grapes are of great importance.

Alenia Composite is a factory of Alenia group producing parts for the Boeing 787.

== Notable people ==
- Antonio Marinari (1605–1689), a Roman Catholic prelate
- Giuseppe Battista (1610–1675), an Italian marinist poet and writer.
- Francis de Geronimo (1642-1716), an Italian Roman Catholic priest and professed Jesuit
- Giuseppe Spagnulo (1936–2016), an Italian sculptor.
- Gianluca Triuzzi (born 1978), an Italian professional football forward
- Giulia Imperio (born 2001), weightlifter and European Weightlifting Championship gold medalist
