= De Felice =

De Felice, De Félice or DeFelice is a surname with Italian and Swiss origins.

== De Felice, de Felice or de Félice ==
- Aurelio De Felice (1915–1996), Italian sculptor
- Emidio De Felice (1918–1993), Italian linguist and lexicographer
- Fabio De Felice (1927–2024), Italian politician
- Fortunato de Felice, 2nd Count Panzutti, (1723–1789), Italian physicist and encyclopedian
- Guillaume de Félice, 4th Count Panzutti, (1803–1871), Savoy theologian and abolitionist
- Jean-Jacques de Felice (1928–2008), French lawyer and human rights activist
- Lionello De Felice (1916–1989), Italian screenwriter and film director
- Renzo De Felice, (1929–1996), Italian historian of fascism
- various other Counts Panzutti

== DeFelice ==
- Cynthia DeFelice (born 1951), American children's author
- Garth DeFelice, American football umpire
- Jonathan DeFelice, American monk and college president

== See also ==
- Palazzo De Felice (disambiguation)
- DiFelice, a surname
- Felice (surname)
