= Palazzo de Felice, Somma Vesuviana =

Palazzo de Félice, Somma Vesuviana
- Palazzo de Félice, Somma Vesuvianae
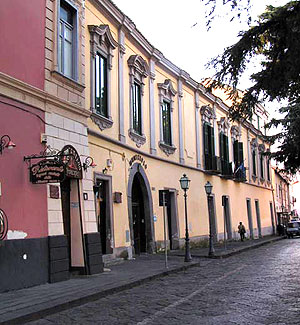

Site information
- Type: Palace
- Owner: de Félice Family
- Condition: Moderate
- Website: https://defeliceestates.wixsite.com/defeliceestates

Location
- Coordinates: 40.87193°N 14.43593°E

Palazzo de Félice (Italian for Palace of the de Félice) is a 16th-century palace in Somma Vesuviana, Province of Naples, in Campania. It is an ancestral home of the de Félice family.

== History of the Palace ==
This Renaissance palace is located in the town of Somma Vesuviana, Province of Napoli, Region of Campania in the South of Italy.

The Palace was built in 1586 and originally owned by the Filangieri family. In 1811, it was bought by the Marquises de Félice. At the time, the de Félice family were participating in a struggle against the local banditry. In a similar manner to the Palazzo in Grottaglie (see above), it is located in the centre of the town, aside houses of the local nobility with similar architecture.

== Architectural details ==
The building is square and has a tower with the de Félice coat of arms carved into it. This overlooks an extensive garden and vineyards. Notable features include a large gateway flanked by columns and an ornate wooden door leading into the garden. There is a main well in the central courtyard which provides water for the house. There are two others outside used in wine production.

The palace contains no less than three chapels, one of which displayed a 17th century Flemish painting of the crucifixion. This was unfortunately looted during the Unification of Italy. The estate was seriously damaged during the Second World War and is now partly used as a Rectory as well as a family home for the de Félice family.
