= Rosciano =

- Comune
- Comune di Rosciano
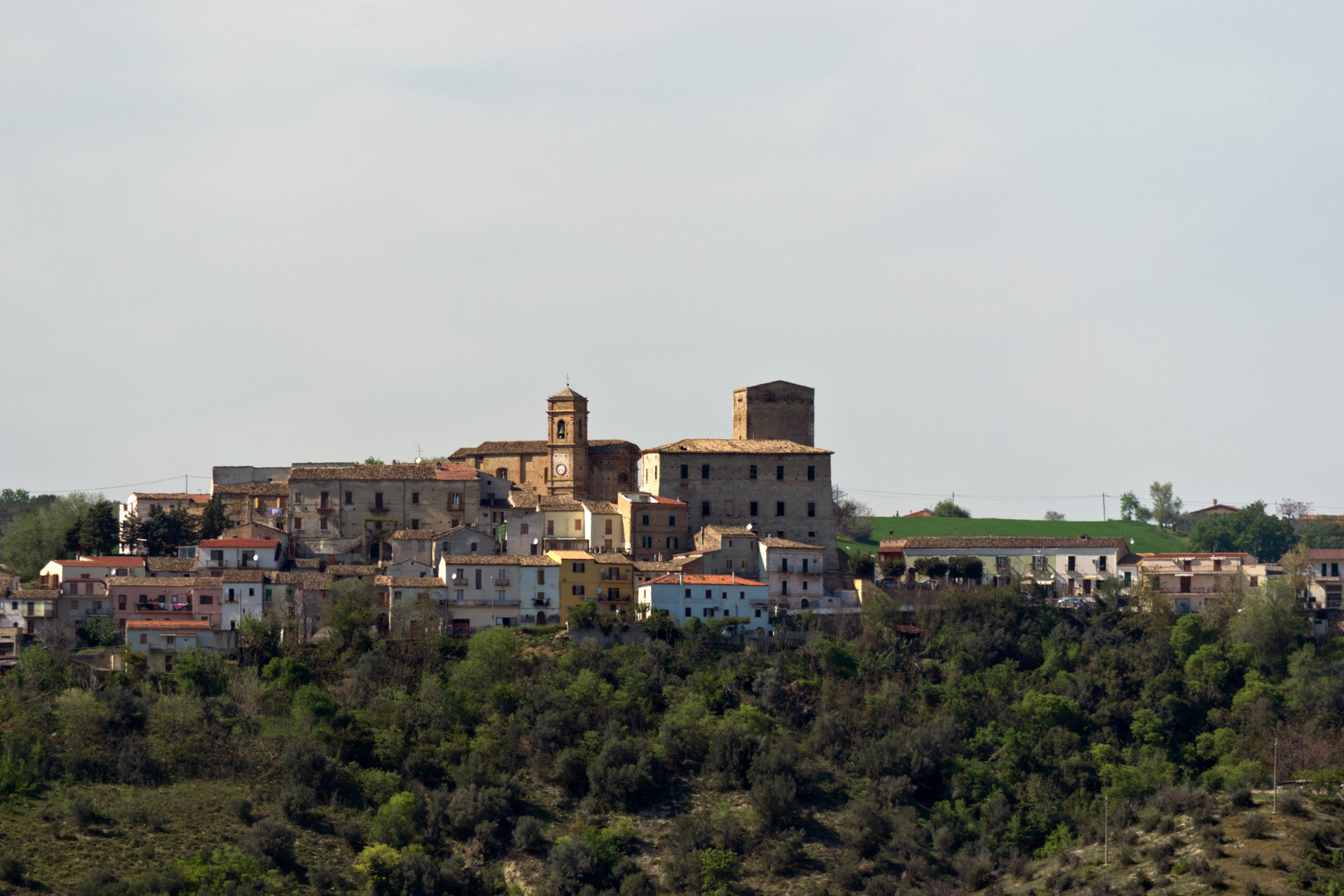
- View of Rosciano

- Location within Italy Location within Abruzzo
- Coordinates: 42°19′N 14°3′E
- Country: Italy
- Region: Abruzzo
- Province: Pescara (PE)
- Frazioni: Cepagatti, Pianella, Nocciano, Alanno, Manoppello, Chieti

Area
  - Total: 27 km^{2} (10 sq mi)
- Elevation: 253 m (830 ft)

Population (1 January 2007)
  - Total: 3,243
  - Density: 120/km^{2} (310/sq mi)
- Demonym: Roscianesi
- Time zone: UTC+1 (CET)
  - Summer (DST): UTC+2 (CEST)
- Postal code: 65020
- Dialing code: 085
- ISTAT code: 068035
- Patron saint: Sant'Eurosia di Jaca

Rosciano is a comune and town in the Province of Pescara in the Abruzzo region of Italy

== See also ==
- Palazzo De Felice
