= Giuseppe Spagnulo =

Italian sculptor (1936–2016)

- Born: 28 December 1936; Grottaglie, Italy
- Died: 15 June 2016 (aged 79); Milan, Italy
- Occupation: Sculptor

Giuseppe Spagnulo (28 December 1936 – 15 June 2016) was an Italian sculptor.

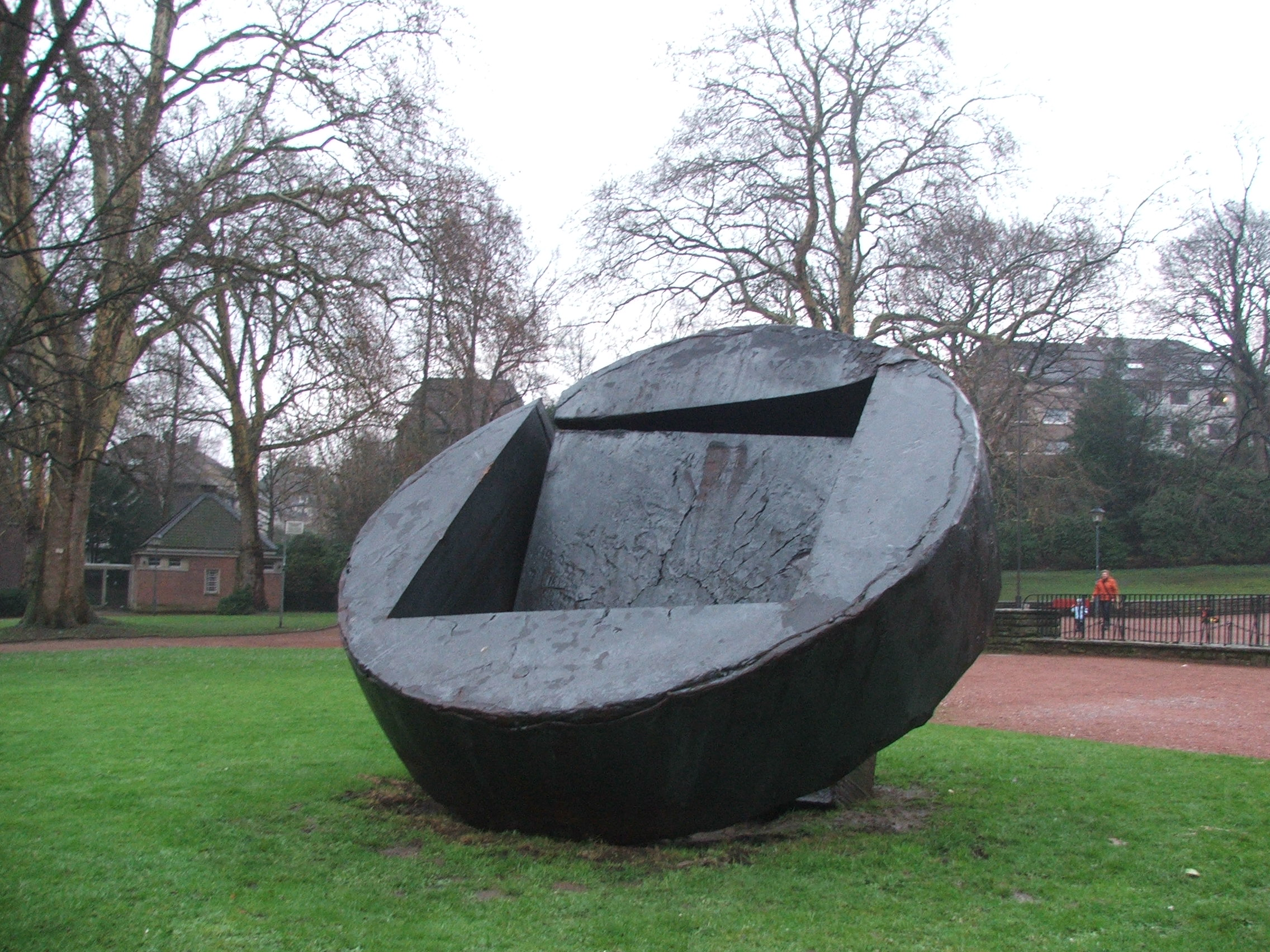
Grande Ruota, sculpture by Giuseppe Spagnulo in Bochum

Born in Grottaglie, Taranto, at young age Spagnulo learned to work on the lathe in his father's ceramic workshop. Between 1952 and 1958 he studied at the Faenza Art Institute for Ceramics and then he moved to Milan, where he enrolled at the Brera Academy and worked as an assistant for Arnaldo Pomodoro and Lucio Fontana.

In the late 1960s, Spagnulo started working on his first sculptures, including the corten steel installation "Black Panther" (1968-1969), which was exhibited at the 1972 Venice Biennale. In 1976 he was at the Venice Biennale again, this time with a solo presentation, and in 1977 he was invited to Documenta in Kassel.

Spagnulo's sculptural style is characterized by the massive dimensions of his sculptures, often made of iron and whose subjects are generally abstract and tend to conceptualism. In the 1990s he started focusing on other materials, such as terracotta and steel. Many of his works are on display in public places in cities such as Rome, Bochum, Venice and Milan.
