= Street prostitution =

Soliciting prostitution from a public place

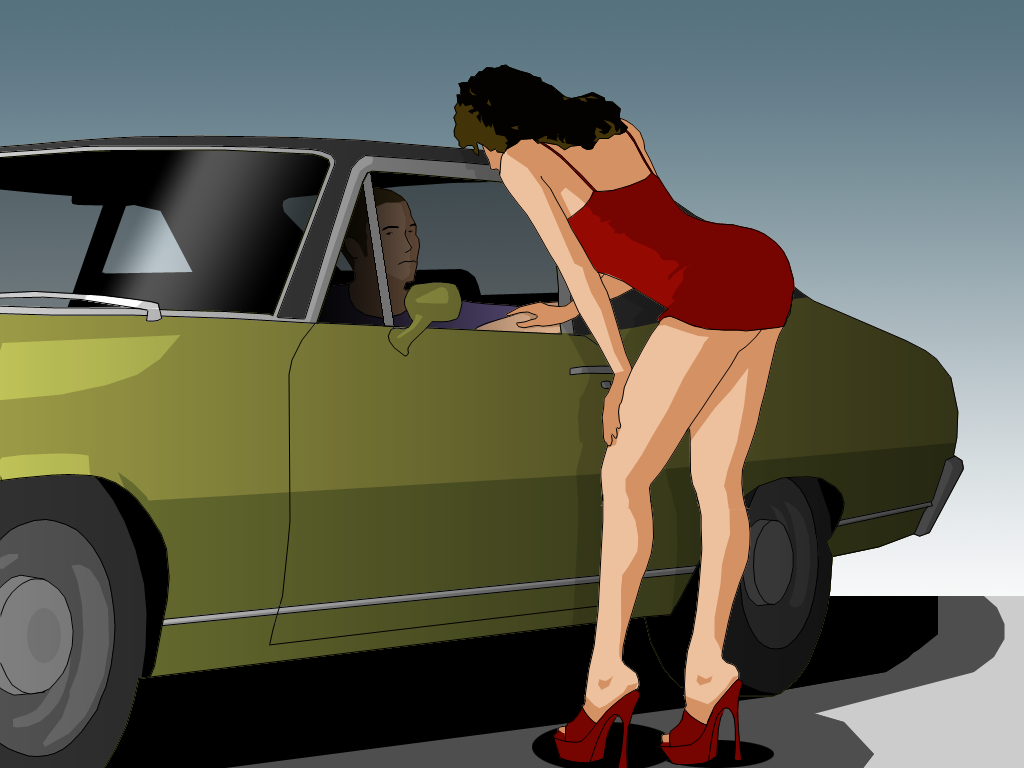
An illustration depicting a prostitute soliciting a potential customer

Street prostitution is a form of prostitution in which a prostitute solicits customers from a public place, most commonly a street, while waiting at street corners or walking alongside a street, but also other public places such as parks, benches, etc. The street prostitute is often dressed in a provocative manner. The sex act may be performed in the customer's car, in a nearby secluded street location, or at the prostitute's residence or in a rented motel room.

== Legality ==
Street prostitution is often illegal, even in jurisdictions that allow other forms of prostitution.

It is estimated that only 10–20 percent of sex workers are working on the streets; however, it is also estimated that 90 percent of the arrests of prostitutes are of street workers (according to a study from 1995).

In some jurisdictions where prostitution itself is legal, such as in the United Kingdom, street prostitution has been made illegal.

Some jurisdictions also outlaw kerb crawling, slowly driving around with the intent to procure the services of a prostitute.

In Australia, in New South Wales it is legal to solicit on the streets, except in some areas (such as near schools). The other Australian states and territories prohibit street solicitation, although some of these jurisdictions allow licensed brothels.

Street prostitution is legal in New Zealand. In Germany it is allowed too, but cities can restrict it to certain areas or hours (regulations vary widely from place to place).

In the United States, street prostitution is illegal in all 50 states; 49 of the states outlaw all forms of prostitution. Nevada allows licensed brothels, but only in some rural areas, not in the major metropolitan areas (only eight counties have active brothels and prostitution outside these brothels is illegal throughout the state).

In two towns in the Netherlands, a special zone (tippelzone) is designated for legal street prostitution. The zone is often in a business park to avoid inconvenience for residents and can include a sex drive-in (afwerkplek). In most of the zones, the prostitutes need a licence.

== Risks and research ==
Street prostitutes are extremely vulnerable to physical and sexual assaults, as well as to muggings by clients and pimps.

The World Health Organization reported that a study in Bangladesh found that between 50% and 60% of street-based prostitutes had been raped by men in uniform, and between 40% and 50% had been raped by local clients.

Melissa Farley's study of 854 prostitutes in nine countries—Canada, Colombia, Germany, Mexico, South Africa, Thailand, Turkey, the United States, and Zambia—found that 95% of prostitutes had been physically assaulted, and 75% had been raped. 89% of the women interviewed stated that they wanted to leave prostitution. However, the methodology and neutrality of Farley's studies has been criticised by other academics such as Ronald Weitzer. Weitzer has also said that Farley's findings are heavily influenced by radical feminist ideology.

In a 2008 study of Chicago, USA street prostitutes, economists Steven D. Levitt and Sudhir Alladi Venkatesh found that women working without pimps work for an average hourly rate of about $25, and those working with pimps make 50% more. This is roughly four times the wage of other jobs available to them. Prostitutes are arrested once for every 450 encounters and every 10th arrest results in jail time.

In 2004, a study in the UK showed that up to 95% of women in street prostitution were problematic drug users, including around 78% heroin users and rising numbers of crack cocaine addicts.

== Impact of COVID-19 ==
During the COVID-19 pandemic, contact professions (which includes prostitution, amongst others) had been banned (temporarily) in some countries. This has resulted in a local reduction of prostitution.

== Modern terminology ==
In recent years there has been a movement to redefine the way that prostitution is talked about. Instead of "prostitution", "sex work", and "sex workers", are the more preferred terminology. This movement began in the late 1970s and is still an effort. Sex work is not specifically associated with prostitution, but rather any type of work that is sexual in nature.

== See also ==
- Solicitation
