= Orneore Metelli =

Italian painter

Orneore Metelli (1872–1938) was an Italian painter of the Naïve art style in his native Umbria.

He began painting at the age of 50 without any prior formal training. He had once been a trombonist for a band in his native Terni. He has awarded a prize at the Paris International Exhibition of 1911. The sculptor Aurelio De Felice in 1936, began earnest artistic critique of his work, after being brought to his attention by the painter Ugo Castellani. The simple canvases, often depicting sparsely populated cityscapes, according to De Felice stand as true, pure, spontaneous, full of energy, without calculation of purpose, without speculation, or internal imbroglios.
