= Palazzo de Felice, Grottaglie =

- Palazzo de Felice, Grottaglie
- Grottaglie
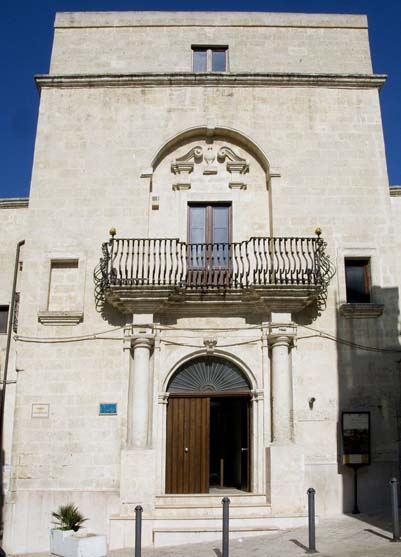

Site information
- Type: Palace
- Owner: de Felice Family
- Condition: Moderate

Location
- Coordinates: 40.53562°N 17.42758°E

Palazzo de Felice (Italian for Palace of the de Felice) is an 18th-century palace in Grottaglie, Province of Taranto Apulia. It is an ancestral home of the de Felice family.

== History of the Palazzo de Félice ==
The palace is located in the centre of Grottaglie, in the Piazza Santa Lucia. In the 18th Century there were 18 houses built, the largest of these was the Palazzo de Felice, which was built in 1767.

== Architecture ==
It is built in the baroque style of the day, boasting an imposing entrance of Corinthian columns, a balcony and a porch. It was acquired by the town in the late 1980s, and now houses an art gallery, which opened in 2006.
