= Victor Attinger =

Swiss publisher and photographer (1856–1927)

- Born: 7 June 1856; Neuchâtel, Switzerland
- Died: 5 June 1927 (aged 70); Chaumont, Neuchâtel, Switzerland
- Occupations: Publisher; photographer
- Spouse: Jeanne-Marie Perrin

Victor Attinger (7 June 1856 – 5 June 1927) was a Swiss publisher and photographer from Neuchâtel. He was responsible in particular for the Dictionnaire géographique de la Suisse and the Dictionnaire historique et biographique de la Suisse.

== Biography ==
Cover of J.-B. Bouvier's Essai sur l'histoire intellectuelle de la Restauration, published in Neuchâtel in 1930 by Éditions Victor Attinger

Victor Attinger was a member of the Attinger family. He was the son of James Attinger, a printer and publisher, and Sophie Röthlisberger. He married Jeanne-Marie Perrin, daughter of Louis, a pastor. He trained in Neuchâtel and Paris, and in 1885 he took over the family business with his brothers Paul and James. After the business split into three firms in 1898, he devoted himself mainly to photography and publishing. In this division Paul (1865–1939) took over the printing works, James (1864–1955) the bookshop and stationery business, and Victor photoengraving and photography. Victor also became director of Éditions Attinger Frères, which still belonged to the three brothers, and around 1920 he took sole charge of it (Éditions Victor Attinger).

Attinger was responsible in particular for large-scale works such as the Dictionnaire géographique de la Suisse (German Geographisches Lexikon der Schweiz, 1902–1910) and the Dictionnaire historique et biographique de la Suisse (German Historisch-Biographisches Lexikon der Schweiz, 1921–1934), the latter still unfinished at his death.

In 1889 Attinger was a founding member of a photographers' society, and the same year he opened a studio for color photographs. In 1915 he opened a film library (cinémathèque). A photographer himself, he employed numerous collaborators to illustrate his publications.

== Bibliography ==
- J. Rychner, M. Schlup (eds.), Editeurs neuchâtelois du XXe siècle, 1987, 27–46
- C. Attinger et al., Victor Attinger, photographe, 1856–1927, 1989
- M. Schlup (ed.), Biographies neuchâteloises, 3, 9–17

=== Archives ===
- Institut suisse pour la conservation de la photographie, Neuchâtel
