= Count Panzutti =

18th-century Italian hereditary title

Fortunato de Félice, 2nd Count Panzutti

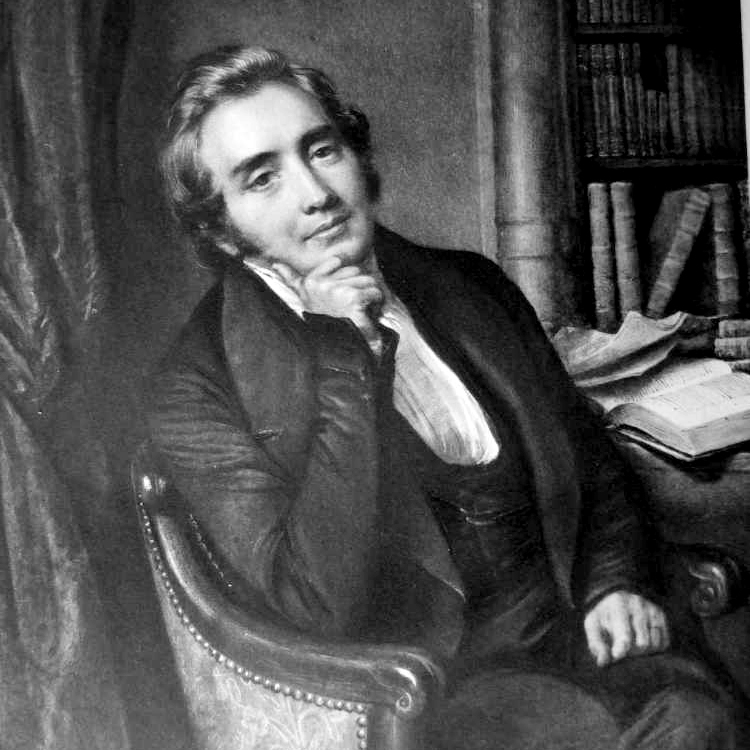
Guillaume de Félice 4th Count Panzutti

Count Panzutti (Conte di Panzutti) is an 18th-century Italian hereditary title, famously held by Fortunato and Guillaume de Félice. The title was passed by decree by the Contessa di Panzutti who held it "suo jure" as instructed in the 1st Count's will to Fortunato Felice in 1756, and has continued being inherited in such a manner to the present day. The heir apparent of the Contadi is styled Vicomte (Viscount) or Vicomtesse (Viscountess) Yverdon.

== Counts Panzutti ==
- H Ill. H Giuseppe Felipe Augusto di Panzutti, 1st Count Panzutti (1720–1756)
- H Ill. H Fortunato Bartolommeo de Félice, 2nd Count Panzutti (1723–1789)
- H Ill. H Fortuné-Bernard de Félice, 3rd Count Panzutti (1760–1832)
- H Ill. H Guillame Adam de Félice, 4th Count Panzutti (1803–1871)
- H Ill. H Henri François Louis Gabriel Guisan de Félice (1837–1895), 5th Count Panzutti (1837–1895)
- H Ill. H Jules Louis Georges Samson Berdez de Félice, 6th Count Panzutti (b. 1858–1925)
- H Ill. H Philippe Grin de Félice (I), 7th Count Panzutti (1893–??)
- H Ill. H Philippe Grin de Félice (II), 8th Count Panzutti (1918–1998)
- H Ill. H Philippe Grin de Félice-Ruttley (III), 9th Count Panzutti (b. 1954)

As the title is held 'suo jure', the Heir Apparents are the present holder's children, chosen upon the present holder's death:

- Olivia Gabriella Celimène de Félice, Viscountess Yverdon (b. 1987)
- Mathieu Philippe Tancrede de Félice, Viscount Yverdon (b. 1989)
- Marie-Sophie Yolande Laetitia de Félice, Viscountess Yverdon (b. 1994)
