= Social purity movement in Switzerland =

Swiss movement against prostitution

The social purity movement in Switzerland (German: Sittlichkeitsbewegung, French: mouvement pour le relèvement moral) arose in the last quarter of the 19th century and devoted itself to the fight against prostitution, which was regarded as a threat to the family and as a symptom of the decay of the bourgeois order. Until about 1900 it campaigned mainly for the closure of brothels; after that, education, welfare, and prevention gained in importance.

== Origins ==
The International Abolitionist Federation (French: Fédération abolitionniste internationale, FAI), initiated in 1875 by the Englishwoman Josephine Butler and based in Geneva, rejected the regulation of prostitution that many European states had introduced in the 19th century to contain venereal diseases, as well as the legal toleration of brothels. In particular, it opposed a one-sided control of prostitutes that spared their clients. As remedies against prostitution it called for chastity outside marriage for men and women, an end to the double standard, and an improvement in the social position of women.

== Organization ==
Title page of a study on the relations between the Internationaler Verein Freundinnen junger Mädchen and the social purity movement, presented by Amélie Humbert-Droz in 1895 and published the same year in Neuchâtel by Attinger Frères

The associations in French-speaking Switzerland (the Dames de l'œuvre de secours and the Dames de la Fédération) largely followed these principles, and as early as 1875 they joined together in the Comité intercantonal de dames de la Suisse. The associations in German-speaking Switzerland, by contrast, also demanded repressive measures against prostitutes. In 1901 they separated from the FAI as the Association of German-Swiss Women's Societies for the Promotion of Morality (Verband deutschschweizerischer Frauenvereine zur Hebung der Sittlichkeit), and by 1912 this had become the largest women's organization in Switzerland, with 25,772 members.

The movement was rooted in Protestant parishes and free church circles. Pastors, teachers, physicians, lawyers, and civil servants were overrepresented in its men's associations, and their wives and sisters in its women's associations. Men acted at the political level, while women were responsible for door-to-door collections and the circulation of petitions, among other things. Men and women of the movement were often also active in the temperance movement and in the charitable women's movement (the Swiss Women's Charitable Association, Schweizerischer Gemeinnütziger Frauenverein, SGF). In Catholic areas, Catholic women's associations (the Swiss Catholic Women's League, SKF), the clergy, and conservative and Christian social politicians worked together to found associations for the protection of girls (Mädchenschutzvereine).

== Activities ==
Title page of the lecture that the physician Marie Heim-Vögtlin gave at the annual meeting of the Zurich Women's League for the Promotion of Morality (Zürcher Frauenbund zur Hebung der Sittlichkeit) on 19 May 1904

Until about 1900 the movement campaigned mainly for the closure of brothels and, above all in German-speaking Switzerland, for the control and criminalization of street prostitutes. It called for the offense of procuring (Kuppelei) to be extended to the renting of apartments and for foreign prostitutes to be expelled, and it worked with the police and the health authorities. After successful referendum campaigns, such as the one in the canton of Zurich in 1897, education (lectures, brochures), welfare, and prevention gained in importance from 1900. The educational measures were aimed above all at women. Mothers from working-class districts were instructed at tea gatherings; women considered at risk or fallen were disciplined in homes through housework and gardening; and the homeless were housed in shelters or with Christian families. Women newly arrived in the city were found lodgings and jobs (through the Freundinnen junger Mädchen, FJM), people released from prison were given support, those classed as "beyond saving" were committed to workhouses (Arbeitsanstalten), and children, most of them born out of wedlock, were placed with foster families.

== Later activities and legislation ==
After the outbreak of World War I, the women's associations, together with the men's associations, extended their educational efforts to soldiers and to the population at large. Among other things, these efforts included the introduction of a closing time (Polizeistunde), restrictions on public dances and entertainments, controls on publications, and the censorship of films and advertising. Together with other women's organizations, the women's associations for the promotion of morality achieved their first successes at the federal level with the Civil Code of 1912, which took into account their petition to raise the marriage age for women to 18 and the age up to which children and young people were considered in need of protection to 20. In their work on the commission for the Criminal Code, adopted in 1938, they sought to raise the age of consent to 18. From 1921 the Association of German-Swiss Women's Societies for the Promotion of Morality called itself Protestant Women's Aid (evangelische Frauenhilfe), and in 1947 it joined the Protestant Women's Federation of Switzerland (Evangelischer Frauenbund der Schweiz, EFS).

== See also ==
- Social purity movement

== Bibliography ==
- B. Mesmer, Ausgeklammert – Eingeklammert, 1988, 157–168
- A.-M. Käppeli, Sublime croisade, 1990
- D. Puenzieux, B. Ruckstuhl, Medizin, Moral und Sexualität, 1994
- S. Janner, Mögen sie Vereine bilden, 1995
- B. Mesmer, "Pflichten erfüllen heisst Rechte begründen", in Schweizerische Zeitschrift für Geschichte, 46, 1996, 332–355
- D. Brodbeck, Hunger nach Gerechtigkeit, 2000
