= Funiculaire de Chaumont =

Funicular railway in Neuchâtel, Switzerland

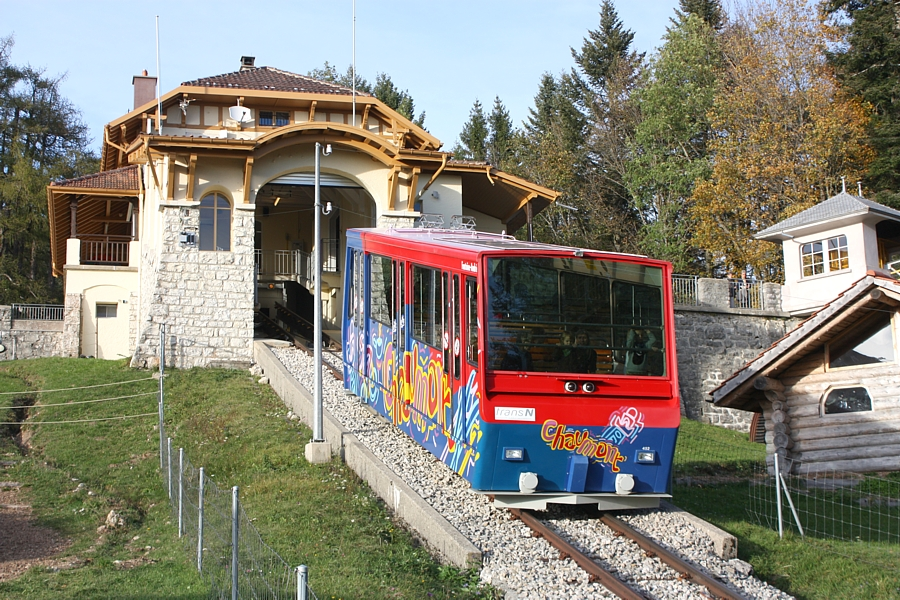
- upper station (2014)

Overview
- Other name(s): Funiculaire La Coudre-Chaumont
- Status: In operation
- Owner: Transports publics Neuchâtelois (TransN, TRN)
- Locale: Neuchâtel; Switzerland
- Termini: "Neuchâtel, La Coudre (FUNI)" at Rue de la Dîme; Chaumont (FUNI)
- Stations: 2
- Website: TransN

Service
- Type: Funicular
- Operator(s): Transports publics Neuchâtelois
- Rolling stock: 1 for 70 persons (since 2007), 2 (before 2007)

History
- Opened: 15 October 1910
- Single car: 2007

Technical
- Line length: 2,091 m (6,860 ft)
- Number of tracks: 1 (with loop until 2007)
- Track gauge: 1,000 mm (3 ft 3 3/8 in)
- Operating speed: 5 metres per second (16 ft/s)
- Highest elevation: 1,087 m (3,566 ft)
- Maximum incline: 46% (min. 14.5%)

Funiculaire de Chaumont is one of the funicular railways in Neuchâtel, Switzerland. It leads from La Coudre at 517 metres (1,696 ft) to Chaumont at 1,087 m (3,566 ft), a viewpoint and summit (1,177 m (3,862 ft)) of the Jura range. The line with a length of 2,091 m (6,860 ft) has a difference of elevation of 570 m (1,870 ft) at an incline from 15% to 46%. It has four viaducts with a total length of 570 m (1,870 ft).

The line was opened in 1910 as a single-track funicular with two cars and a passing loop. A new tram line linked it to Neuchâtel railway station. It replaced a projected two-section funicular.

In 2007, the passing loop and the second car were removed.

The funicular is owned and operated by Transports publics Neuchâtelois.
