= Guillaume de Félice, 4th Count Panzutti =

Savoy nobleman, theologian and abolitionist (1803–1871)

Guillaume de Felice
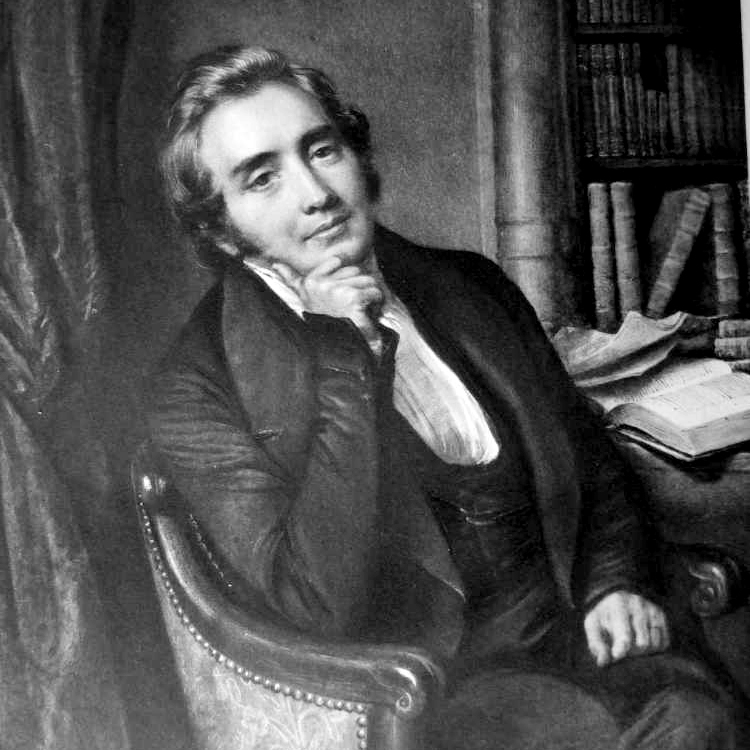
- Born: 12 March 1803; Otterberg, Germany
- Died: 1871 (aged 67–68)
- Partner: Josephine Pernete Theodore-Rivier
- Parent(s): Fortune-Bernard de Felice and Charlotte Marie Catherine Cordier

Guillaume Adam de Félice, 4th Comte de Panzutti (1803–1871) was a Savoy nobleman, theologian and abolitionist.

== Biography ==
=== Early life ===
Félice was born on 12 March 1803 in Otterberg and died on 23 October 1871 in Lausanne and was the grandson of Fortunato de Felice, 2nd Comte di Panzutti, by his son Bernard, 3rd Comte di Panzutti. Guillaume grew up in a French environment as the family settled in Lille in 1804, and inherited his grandfather's vigour for radicalism and academia, and the family title, Comte di Panzutti in 1832, aged 29. He studied theology at Strasbourg and Lausanne universities and was accepted into the Church in 1827. He became a pastor at the Reformed Church of Bolbec, in Normandy Seine-Maritime, then a professor of theology in Montauban, occupying the chair 'de morale et d'éloquence sacrée' (of morality and holy speech). In later life he settled in his family town of Yverdon and married Joséphine Rivier, the daughter of a local aristocrat. They had two children, Sophie de Félice and Théodore de Félice. His daughter Sophie unusually inherited the title suo jure, with her and her husband becoming Count and Countess di Panzutti, Henri François Louis Gabriel Guisan, and thus their grandchildren became cousins of General Henri Guisan, later Commander in Chief of the Swiss Army during WWII. From this branch the family are also second cousins of the baronial family of Stael-Holstein and the ducal family of de Broglie.

=== Abolitionism ===
Whilst at Bolbec, it is thought that his interest in abolitionism was heightened due to its proximity to the slave-port of Le Havre. Félice started the movement against the French slave camps in Guadeloupe, at the time a very controversial subject. It was through his religious beliefs that he pursued his struggle against slavery, resulting in him drafting the famous French petition of 1846 in favor of abolition. Felice maintained a long correspondence with English abolitionists, who won their case in 1833, France abolishing slavery in 1848.

== Bibliography ==
- (Jean) Calvin et l'Eglise de Genève (1822), with Karl Gottlieb Bretschneider
- Essai sur l'esprit et le but de l'Institution Biblique (1824), Pub:Treuttel et Würtz
  - "Ouvrage couronné par le Comité de la Société Biblique Protestante de Paris, dans l'assemblée générale du 16 Avril 1823."
- Propositìons théologiques sur le dogme des Anges (1825) Pub: Proefschrift Straatsburg Silbermann
- De la religion chrétienne dans ses rapports avec la situation (1831), Pub:Société Evangélique
- Discours prononcé a l'ouverture de la chapelle évangélique du Havre, précédé de quelq. détails sur l'ouverture de la chapelle (1834) Pub:Chez J.-J. Risler, Libraire
- Aux Pères et aux Mères sur l'éducation de leurs enfants. Discours prononcé dans le temple de Saverdun (11 October 1840), 54pp, Pub:K.Cadaux
- Avertissement aux églises réformées de France contre l'universalisme
  - 1Ed, 1840, 61pp, Pub: K.Cadaux
  - 2Ed, 1841, Pub: K.Cadaux
- La voix du Colporteur Biblique (The voice of the Bible hawker)
  - 1Ed, 1845 Pub: Jean A. Ackley, 150 Nassau-Street
  - 2Ed, 1846, 280pp, Pub:L.R.Delay
    - 1847 Translated by the Rev. Charles William Bingham MA into English, Pub: Simpkin and Marshall (London)
  - 3Ed, 1860, 280pp, Société des Livres Religieux
- Appel aux chrétiens de France, en faveur de la Société des livres religieux, (1842),
- Émancipation immédiate et complète des esclaves: appel aux abolitionistes (1846) 116pp Pub:L.R.Delay
- Le livre des villageois (1847), 232pp, Pub:L.R.Delay (5 Editions in total) Text
- Histoire des Protestants de France: depuis l'origine de la Réformation jusqu'au temps présent – "History of French Protestants"
  - 1Ed – 1850 – 655pp GoogleBook
  - 2Ed – 1851 – Paris : J. Cherbuliez : Ducloux : Grassart -Revised and corrected GoogleBook
    - 1851 – Translated by Henry Lobdell MD (New York) into English, 624pp, Pub:Edward Walker (New York)GoogleBook
    - 1853 – Translated by Philip EDW Barnes Esq, BA, FLS into English, Pub:George Routledge & Co. (London) GoogleBook
  - 3Ed – 1856 – Paris, J. Cherbuliez, Revised and updated
  - 4Ed – 1861 – Paris: J.Cherbuliez : Meyrueis : Grassart, 694pp. GoogleBook
  - 5Ed – 1873 – Soc. des Livres Religieux
  - 6Ed – 1874 – with François Bonifas, 819pp
  - 7Ed – 1880 – (continued after 1861 to present day by François Bonifas)
  - 8Ed – 1895 – Toulouse, Société des livres religieux, 711pp.
- Les vieillards. Devoirs envers les vieillards. Devoirs des vieillards. Deux, 1863, 154pp, Société des Livres Religieux
- Droits et devoirs des laïques dans la situation présente des Églises réformées de France, 1864, 173pp, Pub: C. Meyrueis, GoogleBook
- Histoire des synodes nationaux des églises réformées de France Paris, 1864, 321pp
- Die Bartholomäusnacht (1865), with TH Hansen
- M. Guizot, sa candidature au conseil presbytéral de l'église réformée de Paris (1865)
- Appel en faveur des noirs emancipes dans les Etats-Unis: discours prononce le 25 juin 1865, dans le Temple de Toulouse (1865) 36pp
- La mission des sociétés savantes de province 1866, 16+pp, Pub:Rives et Faget
- Étienne de Grellet, évangéliste français au dix-neuvième siècle (1867), with Edward Ash
- Biographie de William Allen: membre de la Société des Amis, ou Quakers (1869), 276pp, Pub: C. Meyrueis
- Search the Scriptures: how and why. (1872), (Translated from the French)
- What is the Bible? How and why We Should Read It. – 1886, Pub:D.Lothrop & Co.
- David Rouge: An Authentic Narrative, Unknown date, 268+pp, Pub:American Tract Society GoogleBook Record

== Sources ==
- "Félice, Guillaume de" in German, French and Italian in the online Historical Dictionary of Switzerland.
- Dict. du monde religieux dans la France contemporaine, 5, 1993
- "Un pasteur baptiste guadeloupéen réfléchit sur la 'guerre des mémoires'" – (French)

== Pictures ==
- Guillaume de Félice at Bolbec
