= San Felice =

San Felice may refer to the following places in Italy:

- San Felice a Cancello, in the province of Caserta
- San Felice Circeo, in the province of Latina
- San Felice del Benaco, in the province of Brescia
- San Felice sul Panaro, in the province of Modena
- San Felice del Molise, in the province of Campobasso
- Senale-San Felice, the Italian name for Unsere Liebe Frau im Walde-St. Felix in the province of Bolzano

== Churches ==
- San Felice, Venice, a Roman Catholic church in Venice, region of Veneto, Italy
- San Felice da Cantalice a Centocelle, a Roman Catholic titular church in Rome

== See also ==
- Felix (name)#Saints
- Felice (disambiguation)
- San Felices (disambiguation)
