= Samuel Schwarz (politician) =

Swiss politician

Samuel D. Schwarz (5 March 1814 – 11 March 1868) was a Swiss politician and President of the Swiss Council of States (1855/1856).

Preceded by Constant Fornerod	President of the Council of States; 1855/1856	Succeeded by Aimé Humbert
