= Palazzo De Felice =

Coordinates: 42.3211°N 14.0434°E

De Felice Palace
- Palazzo De Felice
- Rosciano
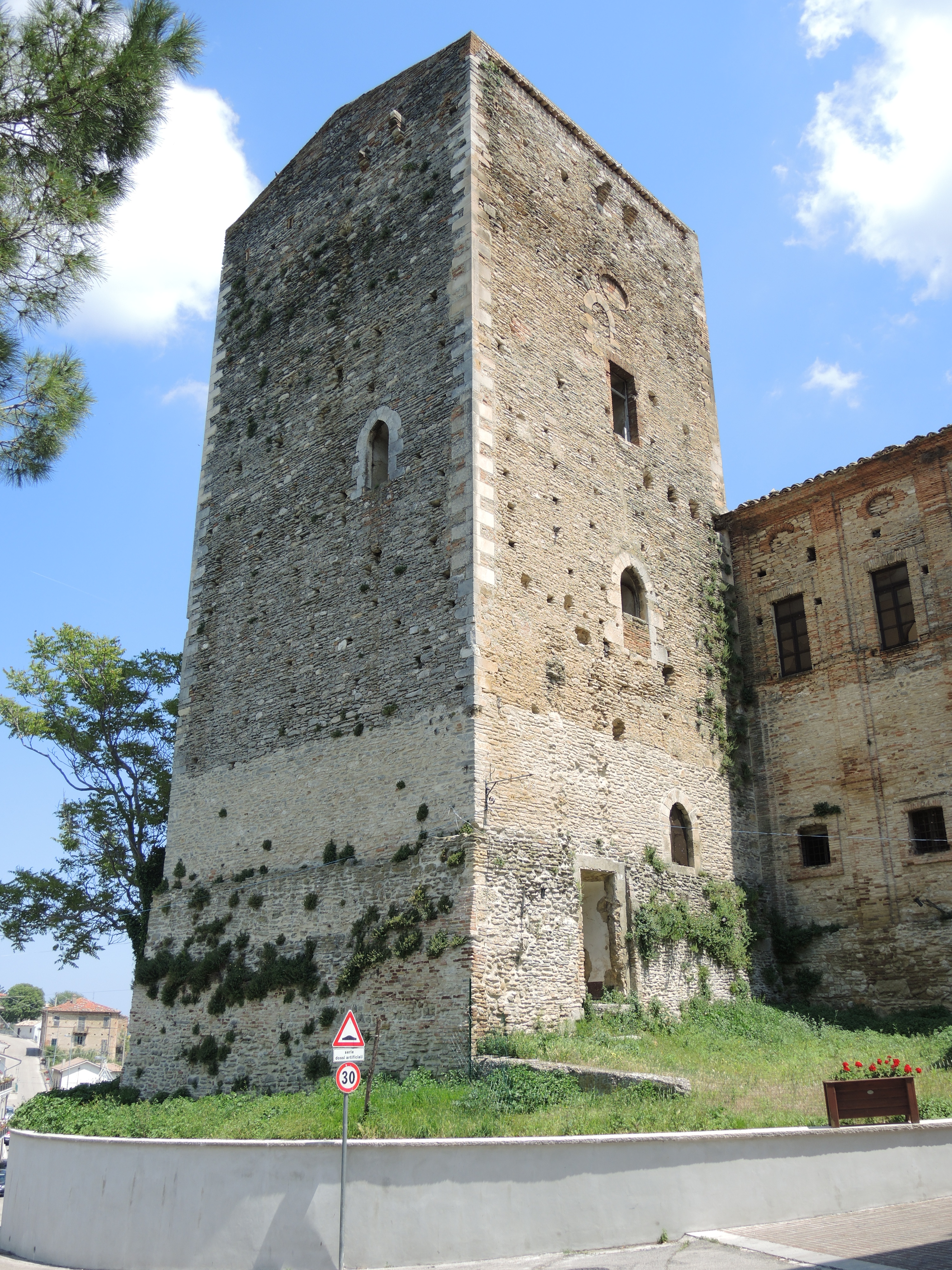
- Tower of Palazzo De Felice

Site information
- Type: Castle
- Owner: de Felice Duchi
- Website: https://defeliceestates.wixsite.com/defeliceestates

Location

Site history
- Built: 11th century

Torre e Palazzo de Felice (Italian for Tower and Palace of the de Felice) is a fortified baroque palace built into a medieval castle in Rosciano, Province of Pescara (Abruzzo). Built on the north bank of the River Pescara, it is an ancestral home of the de Felice family.

== History of the Castle ==
The tower is situated in the town of Rosciano, which is on a hill overlooking the valley of Pescara. This strategic position has had fortifications for over 2000 years, the earliest remains are of a Roman fortification, the foundations of which make-up the base of the Tower. The tower is referred by the local residents as the "Torre dei Paladini", meaning "Tower of the Paladins" - the Paladins being the foremost warriors of the court of Charlemagne at the end of the 8th century. The present day castle was built in the 11th century by the Normans during their conquest of South Italy. The main tower has three floors with windows higher up and a very high base covered with river pebbles, to prevent attackers scaling it. Since then, successive generations have contributed to the structure of the castle, the largest addition being the rectangular Palazzo de Felice in the 15th century.

Currently the tower and the building is owned by the municipality of Rosciano and there are plans to set up an internal Museum in the Arbëreshë tradition as Rosciano has a large Albanian community that has settled in the country since the eighteenth century, as demonstrated by the Byzantine church Villa Badessa.

== History of the Palazzo De Felice ==
Originally a castle built in the 11th century by the Normans, the site now includes a palace built by the De Felice family in the 15th century. This was built in baroque style, completed in 1600. A wide flight of steps flanked by pilasters on the castle's southern face leads to many rooms from a large mezzanine floor. Its beautiful interior belies its military origins, as it was often used as a troop shelter.

== Architecture ==
The present day castle was built in the 11th century by the Normans during their conquest of South Italy. The main tower has three floors with windows higher up and a very high base covered with river pebbles, to prevent attackers scaling it. Since then, successive generations have contributed to the structure of the castle, the largest addition being the rectangular Palazzo De Felice in the 15th century.
