= Jean-Jacques de Felice =

French lawyer (1928–2008)

Jean-Jacques de Felice (May 15, 1928 – July 27, 2008, Paris), was a French lawyer, former vice-president of the Human Rights League of France from 1983 to 1996.

== Biography ==
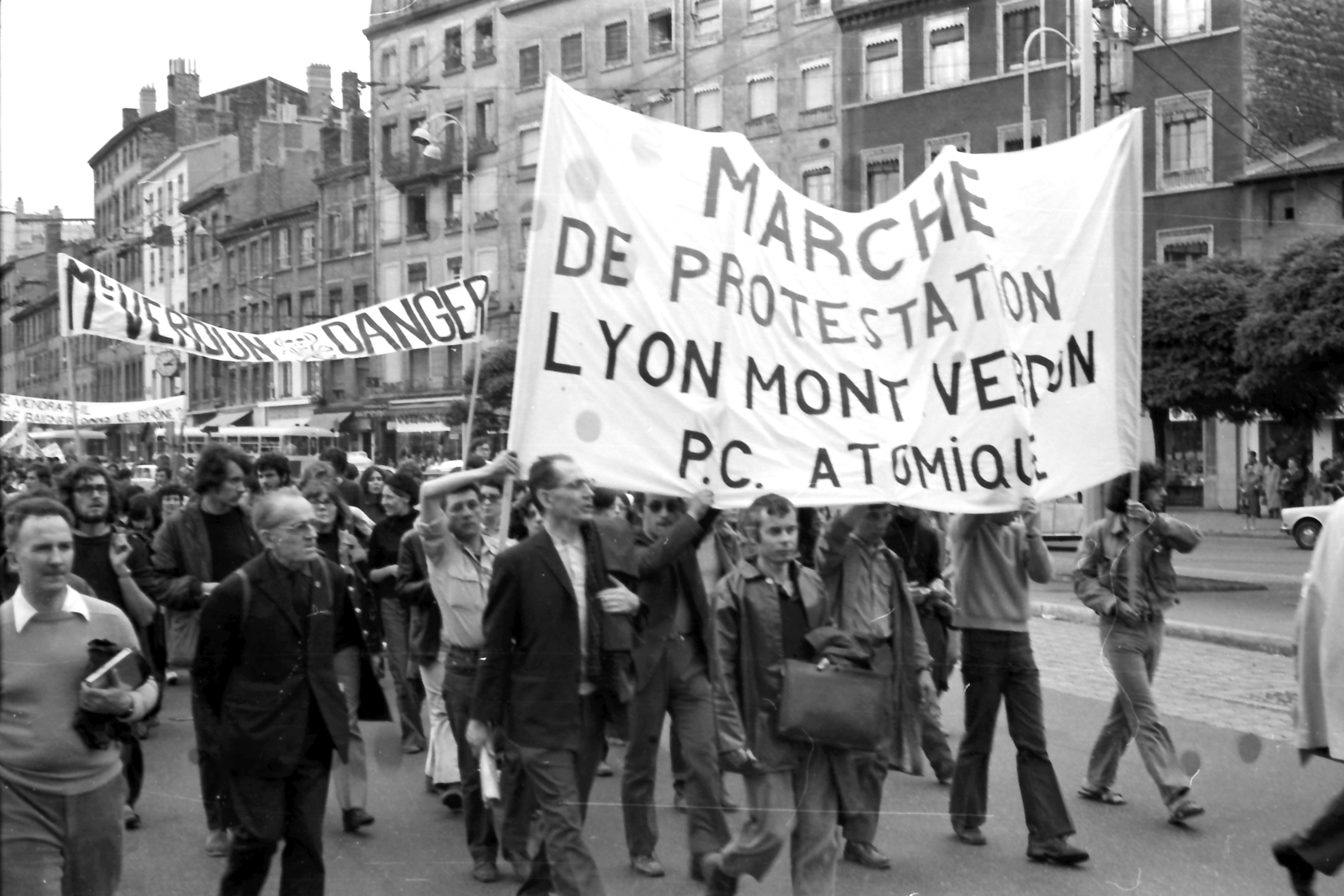
Jean-Jacques de Felice, Théodore Monod, Pastor René Cruse and Yvon Montigné, on 19 June 1971, in the first row of the Group of action and resistance to militarization (GARM), from Lyon to Mont-Verdun, against the nuclear strike force

Jean-Jacques de Felice became known during the Algerian war, when he defended the National Liberation Front FLN militants. He pleaded for peasants of Larzac fighting against the extension of the military cam, for Kanak people and Tahitian separatists, for those homeless alongside Abbé Pierre, conscientious objectors, for foreigners who were in danger (he is a member of Gisti), Italian Red Brigade activists like Marina Petrella and Cesare Battisti. A criminal lawyer, he defended Lucien Léger, who was sentenced to life imprisonment in 1966, for the murder of a child. The longest sentence any of his client got. At the age of 41 he told Jean-Jacques de Felice. "There is a period of detention beyond which justice is turned into revenge.

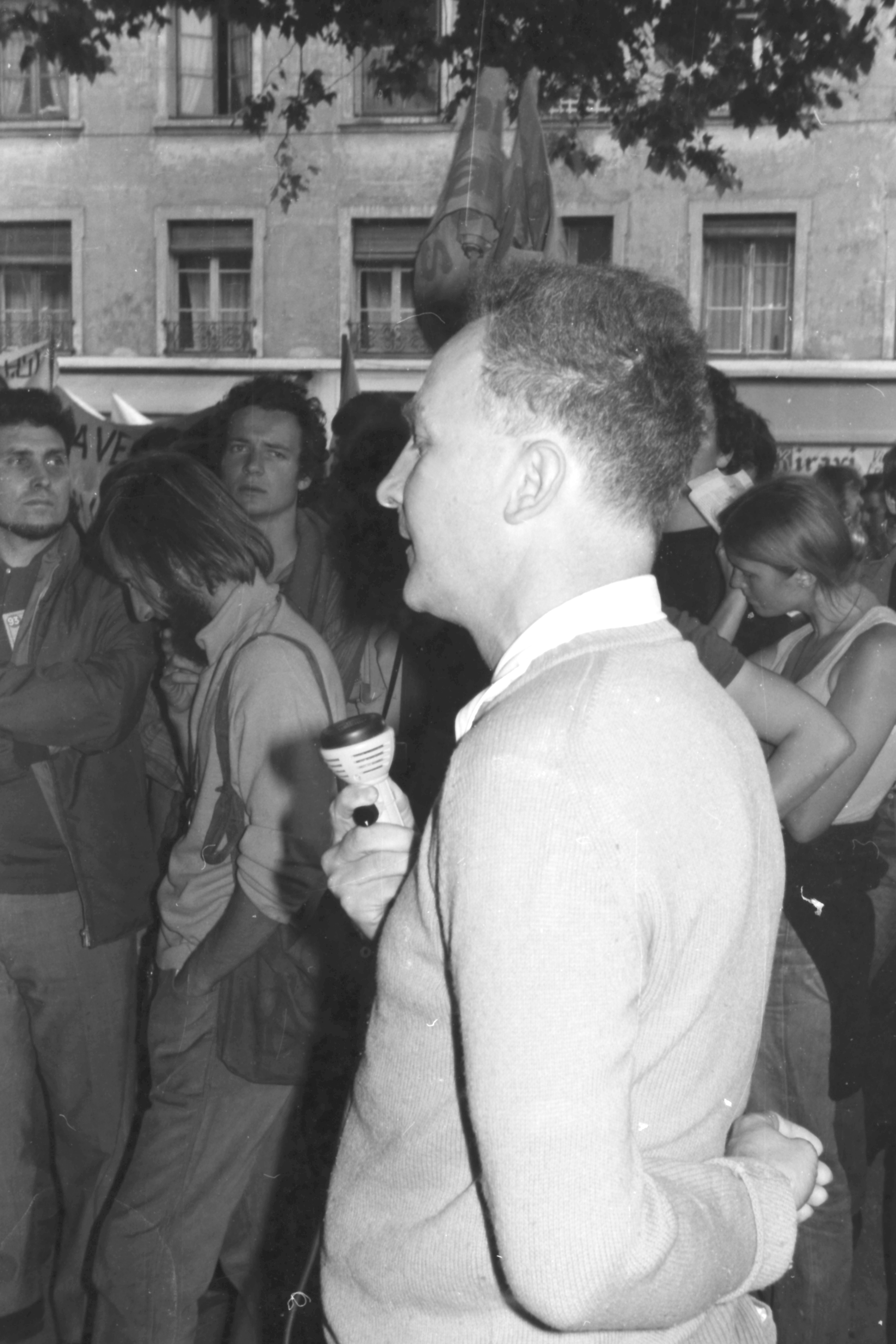
Jean-Jacques de Felice speaks during the march of the Militaris Action and Resistance Group n, against the strike force nuclear power, from Lyon to Mont Verdun, June 19, 1971.

With ideas close to historian Madeleine Reberioux, or the Hellenist Pierre Vidal-Naquet, Felice always spoke "in opposition to the established order”.

The causes Jean-Jacques de Félice chose to defend created an apparent paradox. As a lawyer he defended activists who resorted to violence (Red Brigades, Red Army Faction, or the Algerian independence activists), while he always claimed pacifism and non-violence, which explains his commitment alongside conscientious objectors. What he followed as a lawyer reflects a humanism illustrated by his involvement in movements such as the League of Human Rights.

Jean-Jacques de Félice had a Protestant culture and background. His father, Pierre de Félice, himself a lawyer, was a politician and secretary of state, member of parliament, senator of Loiret (republican left) under the Fourth Republic. His mother was very deeply Protestant and this was always in this memory. as Felice himself felt the same. De Felice owes Protestantism his first commitment to the Young Éclaireuses et éclaireurs unionistes de France, which made him aware of the problems of youths. which in the aftermath of the Second World War was important. These were his first time his defendants were of the deprived youths who wanted him to take more political commitment: defending young people, orchildren of Algerians especially those in shantytowns of Nanterre. it will naturally be necessary to defend their fathers who were FLN militants who will encourage them in their struggle.

For his beliefs Jean-Jacques de Félice was in favor of refusing to join the military service. He participated, in the city of Lyon, in debates and demonstrations of the Action Group and resistance to militarization. At the March of Peace of June 19, 1971, he took the lead and spoke for the crowd, and then marched along thousands of people from Lyon to the command post of the Mont Verdun nuclear strike force.

Achieves of Speeches of Jean-Jacques de Félice can be found in the contemporary international documentation library of France (La contemporaine).
