= San Felices, Soria =

San Felices
- Municipality
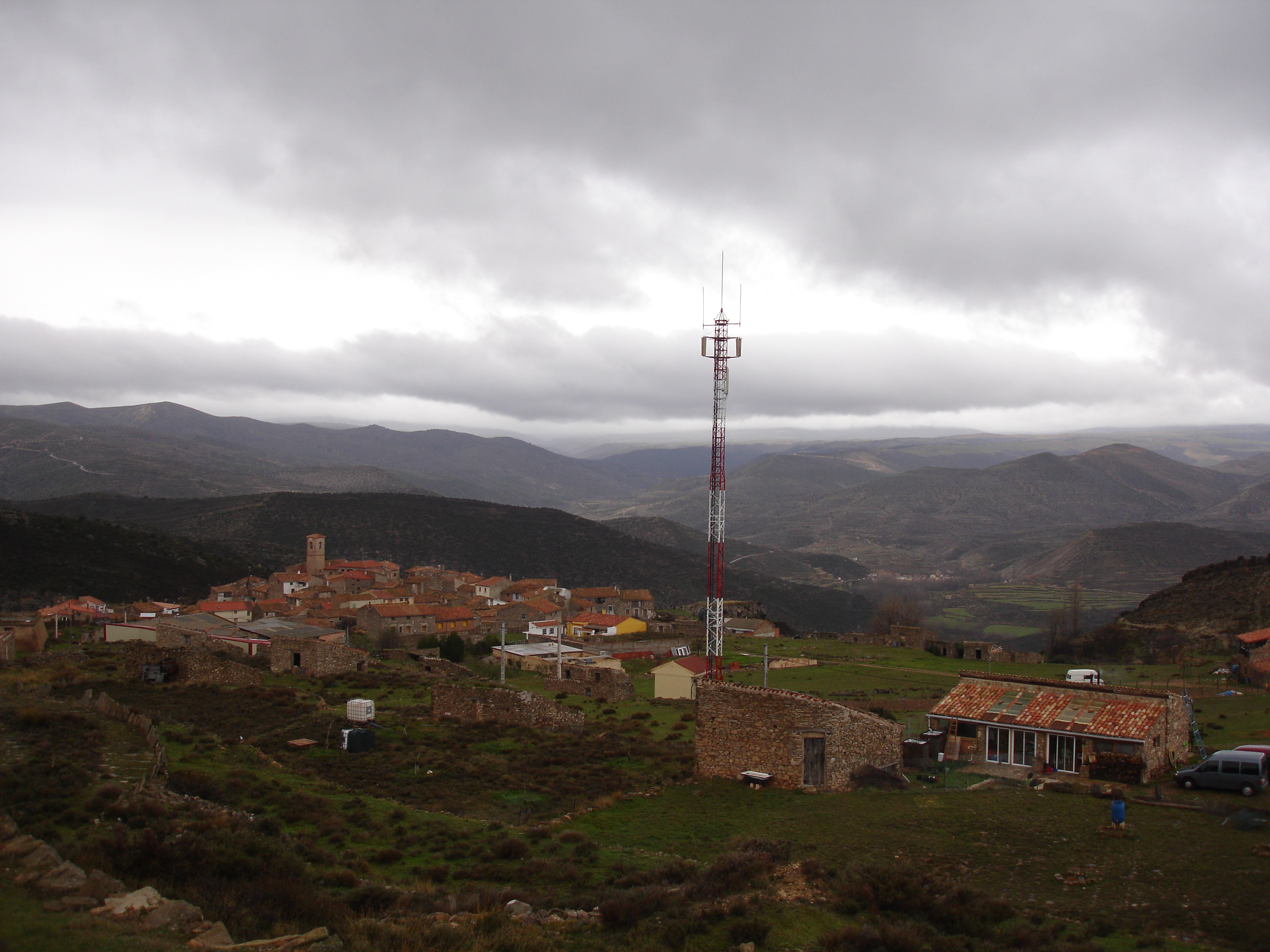

- Location in Spain. San Felices (Spain)
- Coordinates: 41°56′13″N 2°01′37″W
- Country: Spain
- Autonomous community: Castile and León
- Province: Soria
- Municipality: San Felices

Area
  - Total: 21.10 km^{2} (8.15 sq mi)

Population (2025-01-01)
  - Total: 55
  - Density: 2.6/km^{2} (6.8/sq mi)
- Time zone: UTC+1 (CET)
  - Summer (DST): UTC+2 (CEST)
- Website: Official website

San Felices is a municipality located in the province of Soria, Castile and León, Spain. According to the 2022 census (INE), the municipality has a population of 61 inhabitants.
