= DiFelice =

DiFelice is a surname. Notable people with the name include:

- Mike DiFelice (born 1969), American baseball player
- Mark DiFelice (born 1976), American baseball player and coach

== See also ==
- De Felice
- Felice
