= Chaumont (Neuchâtel) =

Mountain in Switzerland

- Location within Switzerland

Highest point
- Elevation: 1,180 m (3,870 ft)
- Coordinates: 47°02′25″N 6°58′20″E

Geography
- Location: Neuchâtel, Switzerland
- Parent range: Jura Mountains

Chaumont is a mountain peak in Switzerland in the Jura Mountains, with a maximum altitude of 1,180 metres (3,870 feet). Below the southern face is the city of Neuchâtel and the lake with the same name.

Funiculaire de Chaumont provides access to the summit from Neuchâtel, starting in the station at La Coudre, rising 570 m (1,870 ft) to an altitude of 1,087 m (3,566 ft). At the summit, there is an observatory tower with a viewing platform 60 m (200 ft) high, providing panoramic views.

== Climate ==
Climate data for Chaumont, elevation 1,136 m (3,727 ft), (1991–2020)
Month	Jan	Feb	Mar	Apr	May	Jun	Jul	Aug	Sep	Oct	Nov	Dec	Year
Mean daily maximum °C (°F)	1.6 (34.9)	2.1 (35.8)	5.5 (41.9)	9.4 (48.9)	13.6 (56.5)	17.5 (63.5)	19.6 (67.3)	19.1 (66.4)	14.6 (58.3)	10.6 (51.1)	5.6 (42.1)	2.5 (36.5)	10.1 (50.3)
Daily mean °C (°F)	−0.9 (30.4)	−0.8 (30.6)	2.4 (36.3)	5.7 (42.3)	9.6 (49.3)	13.2 (55.8)	15.3 (59.5)	15.1 (59.2)	11.2 (52.2)	7.5 (45.5)	3.0 (37.4)	0.1 (32.2)	6.8 (44.2)
Mean daily minimum °C (°F)	−3.4 (25.9)	−3.5 (25.7)	−0.5 (31.1)	2.6 (36.7)	6.4 (43.5)	9.8 (49.6)	11.7 (53.1)	11.6 (52.9)	8.2 (46.8)	4.8 (40.6)	0.4 (32.7)	−2.5 (27.5)	3.8 (38.8)
Average precipitation mm (inches)	101.5 (4.00)	87.1 (3.43)	84.0 (3.31)	84.0 (3.31)	110.5 (4.35)	107.9 (4.25)	106.9 (4.21)	121.2 (4.77)	94.4 (3.72)	105.5 (4.15)	104.2 (4.10)	128.7 (5.07)	1,235.9 (48.67)
Average snowfall cm (inches)	49.7 (19.6)	56.1 (22.1)	31.3 (12.3)	14.4 (5.7)	0.6 (0.2)	0.0 (0.0)	0.0 (0.0)	0.0 (0.0)	0.0 (0.0)	2.7 (1.1)	21.4 (8.4)	54.0 (21.3)	230.2 (90.7)
Average relative humidity (%)	83	80	77	73	75	75	73	76	81	84	84	83	79
Source 1: MeteoSwiss
Source 2: NOAA
