= Aurelio De Felice =

Italian sculptor (1915–1996)

Aurelio De Felice (October 29, 1915–June 14, 1996) was an Italian sculptor. He is considered one of the most important examples of the movement oppose to the Novecento Italiano. His masterpieces are exhibited all around the world.

== Biography ==
De Felice was born in Torre Orsina, a small town on the hills around Terni. Of humble origins, he began his studies in contrast with his family at the Scuola Romana in the 1930s. He earned a degree at the Academy of Fine Arts of Rome, becoming a professor there. De Felice alternated lessons and artistic activity with many personal exhibitions. The most important in that period was the one in the Gallery of Rome, introduced by Renato Guttuso.

At the end of the Second World War, De Felice started to travel across Europe. In those years he exhibited in Switzerland, Germany and France, where he created, in Paris, on behalf of the Italian Ministry of Foreign Affairs, the School of Italian Art. There he met Pablo Picasso, Fernand Léger, Jean Cocteau, Kees van Dongen, Ossip Zadkine, Mark Tobey and Constantin Brâncuși. He did not allow himself to be involved in the big debate between realism and formalism in the 1950s, continuing on his own road.

In 1961 De Felice created the Institute of Arts in Terni. In those years he continued to exhibit all over Europe (Italy, Germany, Switzerland, France). In 1967 he was in charge of the Italian Institute of Culture in Hamburg and the Center of Italian Studies in Zurich.

In 1977 he was invited to the National Museum of Modern Art, Tokyo, for a conference on Orneore Metelli, a "painter-shoemaker" from Terni, and father of the Naïve Italian movement, whose art had become famous thanks to De Felice's work.

His last exhibition took place in 1982; after that, disease forced the sculptor to limit his activity. He spent the last years of his life in the quiet of his house on the hills of Torre Orsina, where he died on June 14, 1996.

== Bibliography ==
- A. De Felice scultore (ed. Il Ponte; preface by Trombadori). Florence 1942
- De Felice scultore (ed. Danesi; preface by Savinio). Rome 1948
- 33 Disegni di Aurelio De Felíce (ed. Mediterranee; preface by Ferruccio Ulivi). Rome 1958
- Documenta: Encyclopédie Générale des Beaux-Arts aux XIX et XX siècles: "Les cahiers d'Art-Documenta" — numero 251 — Ecole Italienne n. 4 (ed. P. Cailler). Geneva 1968
- A. De Felice, Scultore della Scuola Romana: Documenti dal 1937 al 1968 (ed. Müller). Zurich 1968 (in German, Italian and English)
- A. De Felice, Diario di uno scultore (preface by Vivaldi). Rome: Carte Segrete 1979
