= Filice (surname) =

Filice is a surname. Notable people with the surname include:

- Fabio Filice (born 1981), Canadian football player
- Francis P. Filice (1922–2015), American priest
- Jim Filice (born 1962), American motorcycle racer

== See also ==
- Felice
- Filipe
