= Sex drive-in =

Building-less brothel system

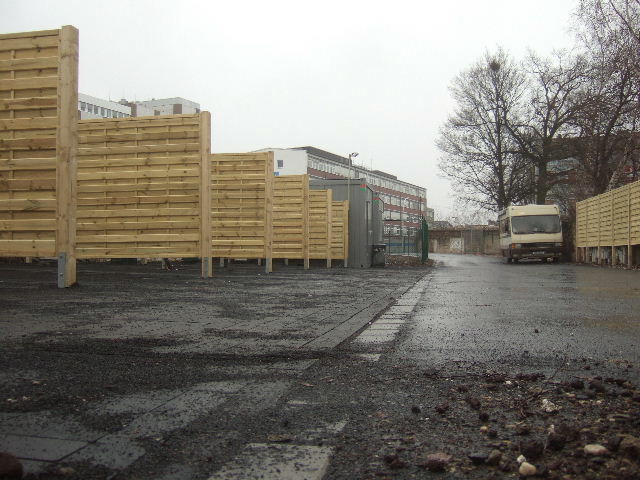
"Verrichtungsboxen" in Bonn, Germany

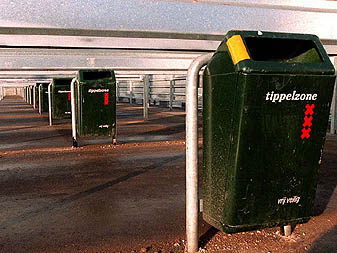
View of sex drive-in facility in Amsterdam (where panels do not reach to the ground), which is now closed

A sex drive-in or sex box is a car garage (or similarly shielded location) that is designed to allow prostitution to take place using cars, and can be found in a few countries in Europe. Generally the facilities are created by local authorities to put some control on where prostitution occurs and to provide increased safety.

== Background ==
The concept started in the Netherlands where such facilities are called afwerkplek (literally meaning "a place to finish the work"; more to the point, "a sheltered area, provided by the authorities, where prostitutes provide their services"), and was first used in Utrecht starting in 1986. It was later adopted in Germany (Verrichtungsbox in German, which translates somewhat as "effectuation box" but with a hint of banality and mundaneness), where the Utrecht model was first used in Cologne in 2001. There, a football field-sized, fenced-in space of a former industrial area (typically the kind of area where there are no residents to complain about the location), with a gated entry, security cameras, and alarm buttons in each stall.

Generally facilities are designed so that the driver cannot exit the vehicle after pulling into the structure, but the prostitute can. In 2008, this design width was reported to be a problem in the Utrecht sex drive-in because the growing sizes of SUV and luxury cars meant they were having difficulties fitting into the slots.

== Expansion to Switzerland ==
In 2013, the first facility in Switzerland opened in Zürich. In addition to security, the stalls are equipped with alarm buttons. Zurich voters approved the building of the facility in a referendum in March 2012. Due to numerous complaints of public prostitution affecting residents, Zurich began considering the project in 2010 and visited other facilities including those in Cologne and Essen, and Swiss news reports referred to the concept as sex-boxen (sex boxes).

== See also ==
- Prostitution in Europe
