= Aimé Humbert-Droz =

Swiss politician, traveler and educator (1819–1900)

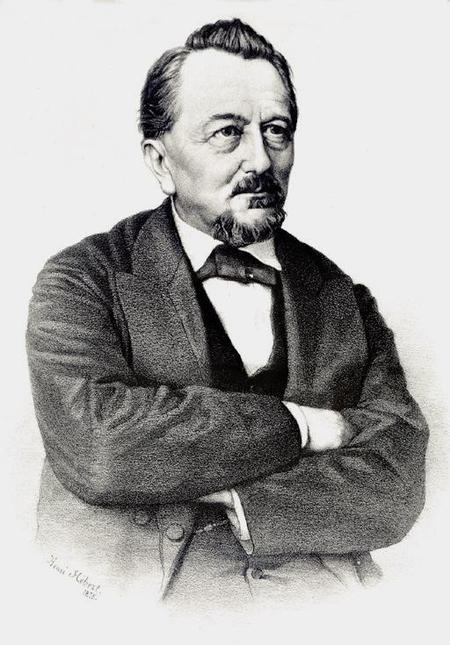
Portrait of Aimé Humbert-Droz in 1875

Aimé Humbert-Droz (29 June 1819 in La Chaux-de-Fonds – 19 September 1900 in Neuchâtel) was a Swiss politician, traveler and educator.

He was elected president of the Swiss Council of States in 1856 and president of the Union Horlogère Suisse in 1858.

Humbert-Droz is also renowned for leading the first Swiss Diplomatic mission to Japan and successfully signing the first trade agreement between the two nations (formally known as the "Treaty of Amity and Trade") on 6 February 1864 with the support of Dutch Consul General Dirk de Graeff van Polsbroek. After Humbert-Droz left Japan, De Graeff van Polsbroek represented Switzerland as interim consul general.

== Background ==
While serving as president for both the Swiss Council of States and Union Horlogère Swiss, Humbert-Droz became the envoy plenipotentiary of the Swiss federal government to Japan in the years 1863–1864 with the mission to conclude a treaty of trade and amity with the shogunate.

The trade agreement he officially signed was modeled after the five unequal treaties concluded in the Ansei era (1854–59) with the United States, France, Britain, Russia and the Netherlands. The Swiss treaty was the first treaty Japan concluded with a land-locked nation state that had no military presence of its own in East Asia.

During his stay of ten months in Nagasaki, Kanagawa and Edo, he composed a large collection of Japanese artifacts documenting popular art and life of Bakumatsu Japan. Among his collection are valuable pieces from the early work of photographer Felice Beato as well as many Japanese paintings and prints. This collection is now held at the Ethnographic Museum of Neuchâtel, Switzerland.

Preceded by Samuel Schwarz	President of the Council of States; 1856	Succeeded by Jakob Dubs

== Works ==
- Le Japon illustré, 1870, translated as Japan and the Japanese illustrated
