= Attinger family =

Swiss family of printers and publishers

The Attinger family is a family of printers and publishers who came from Württemberg and settled in Neuchâtel, Switzerland. Charles Attinger founded a printing works in Neuchâtel in 1831, and the family's publishing house later published the Dictionnaire géographique de la Suisse and the Dictionnaire historique et biographique de la Suisse.

== History ==
Exercise of military balloon troops in front of the Church of Notre-Dame in Neuchâtel, 1915; photograph by Victor Attinger

Charles Attinger (1784–1839), a typesetter, settled in Neuchâtel in 1803 and founded a printing works there in 1831. His son James (1818–1885) took over the business in 1839 and extended it to publishing; among other things, he published the first daily newspaper in Neuchâtel, the Gazette de Neuchâtel.

The firm's vocation as a publisher only truly asserted itself in the third generation, with Victor, Paul (1865–1939), and James (1864–1955). The house of Attinger Frères then added bookselling, bookbinding, photoengraving, and photography to printing and publishing. In 1898 it split into three separate firms: Paul took over the printing works, James the bookshop and stationery business, and Victor photoengraving and photography. Victor also became director of Éditions Attinger Frères, which was still owned by the three brothers, and around 1920 he took sole charge of it (Éditions Victor Attinger). The firm published, among other works, the Dictionnaire géographique de la Suisse (German Geographisches Lexikon der Schweiz, 1902–1910) and the Dictionnaire historique et biographique de la Suisse (German Historisch-Biographisches Lexikon der Schweiz, 1921–1934). A branch was opened in Paris in 1908.

World War II, and then the death of James-Louis in 1962, slowed the firm's activities. The Paris branch closed in 1976. In 1979 Gilles, a grandson of Paul, founded Éditions Gilles Attinger in Hauterive.

== Bibliography ==
- J. Rychner, M. Schlup (eds.), Editeurs neuchâtelois du XXe siècle, 1987, 27–46
