= Fortunato de Felice, 2nd Count Panzutti =

Fortunato Bartolomeo de Félice Count di Panzutti
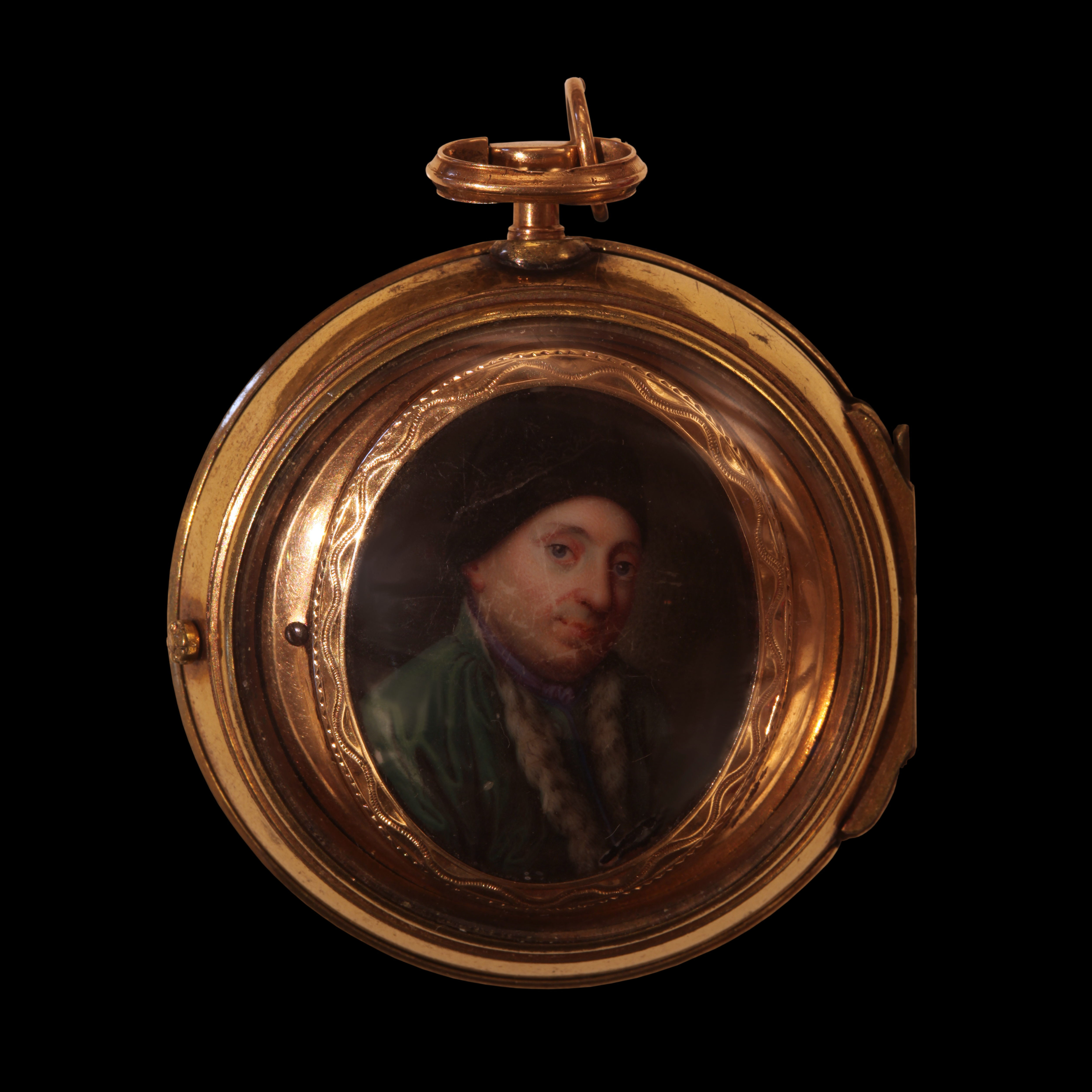
- Born: Fortunato Bartolomeo de Félice; Rome, Italy
- Occupations: Nobleman, author, scientist
- Spouse(s): Agnese Arcuato, Countessa di Panzutti (m. 1759)
- Website: http://de-felice.org/

Fortunato de Felice

Fortunato Bartolomeo de Felice (24 August 1723 – 13 February 1789), 2nd Comte de Panzutti, also known as Fortuné-Barthélemy de Félice and Francesco Placido Bartolomeo De Felice, was an Italian nobleman, a famed author, philosopher, scientist, and is said to have been one of the most important publishers of the 18th century. He is considered a pioneer of education in Switzerland, and a formative contributor to the European Enlightenment.

== Life ==
Fortunato Bartolomeo de Félice was born in Rome to a Neapolitan family, as the eldest of six children, on 24 August 1723. He was confirmed in 1733, in the parish of St. Celso e Giuliano. At the age of 12, he studied at Rome and Naples under the Jesuits, taught by the Franciscan Fortunato da Brescia.

On 28 May 1746, he was ordained by papal dispensation, whilst also teaching philosophy. Through his studies at the monastery of San Francesco in Ripa, he discovered a love of physics, becoming friends with Celestino Galiani. In 1753, Galiani appointed de Félice chair of Ancient and Modern Geography, and the chair of experimental physics and mathematics at Naples University. There he became friends with the Prince Raimondo di Sangro who aided him in his translation of the physicist John Arbuthnot's works from Latin.

After rescuing the imprisoned Countess Panzutti, Félice and his new wife Agnese fled to Bern, with the help of his friend Albrecht von Haller, due to religious persecution from the Catholic Church in Rome. He then converted to Protestantism.

In 1758, he founded with de:Vincenz Bernhard Tscharner the Typographic Society of Bern, which was an Italian-speaking ( l'Estratto de la europea letterature until 1762) and a Latin (l'Excerptum totius Italicae nec non-Helveticae literaturae, to 1766) literary and scientific journal.

In 1762, after the death of the Countess Panzutti due to influenza at Tscharner's residence, Château Lansitz, de Felice moved to Yverdon where he founded an educational institute for young people from all over Europe, and a printing press. The latter quickly developed into one of the most distinguished in Switzerland, producing the Yverdon Encyclopedia, for which Panzutti is now famous. In 1769, he became a citizen of Yverdon and thereby became Swiss.

He was married four times and had 13 children: in 1756 to Countess Agnese Arcuato, Countessa di Panzutti (1720–1759) (whereby his title was received jure uxoris, so Arcuato's previous husband was recorded as the first Count Panzutti), in 1759 to Susanne de Wavre Neuchâtel (1737–1769), in 1769 to Louise Marie Perrelet (died 1774), and in 1774 to Jeanne Salomé Sinet.

He died in Yverdon-les-Bains.

== Work ==
De Felice is considered a significant contributor to education in Switzerland. As editor and translator of Burlamaqui's Principes du Droit Naturel, his name became synonymous with natural law throughout Europe. His most important work is the Encyclopédie d'Yverdon, which he headed as editor and for which he wrote more than 800 articles. From 1770 to 1780 he published 58 volumes, and as the Encyclopédie of Paris had a new version of the Protestant perspective.

His other work consists of half a dozen educational, philosophical and scientific books. He translated the works of René Descartes, d'Alembert, Maupertuis and Newton into Italian.

In de Felice's famous printing house, as well as the Encyclopedia, he translated into French works of Elie Bertrand, Charles Bonnet, Jean-Jacques Burlamaqui, Albrecht von Haller, Gabriel Seigneux de Correvon, Samuel-Auguste Tissot, Johann Joachim Winckelmann and other Enlightenment authors.

The two magazine projects of the Typographic Society Bern aimed at an international exchange of knowledge. This allowed Tscharner and de Felice to create a correspondent network all over Europe.

== Portrait ==
An 18th-century depiction of de Félice is held by the Achenbach Foundation in the San Francisco Museum of Fine Arts. A Latin and 18th-century French inscription by one of his sons, Carolus de Félice reads:

Original	Translation
Fortunatus De Felice Roma 24 Augusti 1723. Natus: ibidem, deinceps. Neapoli Phil. Phys. exp. et Mathem. quondam Professor: Mundi, hominisque legum sedulus Inda- gator, et felix qua Voce, qua Scriptus Interpres; Encyclopediae Ebrodunensis Contaborator et Editor	Fortunato de Felice Born: Rome, 24 August 1723; Naples – Philosophy, Physics and Maths; Professor – World, a zealous investigator by this love of speech wrote the Yverdon Encyclopaedia editor and contributor
Cet Auteur, distingué par un profond Génie, Dans le sein de l'Erreur trouva la Vérite; Et sachant la montrer dans l'Encyclopédie, S'est fait un titre sür à l'Immortalité. Offerebat Obseq. et Devot. Filius; Carolus de Felice	This author, distinguished by a profound genius, In the bosom of wandering found truth And searching that in the encyclopedia Immortalised himself Offered dutifully by his devoted son, Carolus De Felice

He also had a portrait commissioned, done by an unknown artist. The current holder of the portrait, the de Felice Duchi Estate, puts this painting as the best representation of de Felice in existence.

== Works ==
- Etrennes aux désœuvrés ou Lettre d'Quaker à ses frères et à un grand docteur. 1766th (In this work Felice railed against the so-called philosophers and Voltaire )
- Mémoires de la Société oeconomique de Berne (24 volumes, 1763–72)
- Essay manière la plus sûre d'un système de police établir of grains. Yverdon 1772nd
- Dictionnaire géographique, historique et politique de la Suisse. 2 vols. Neuchâtel 1775th
- Dictionnaire de justice naturelle et civile. 1778th 13 volumes
- Tableau philosophique de la religion Chrétienne, considérée dans son ensemble dans sa morale et dans ses consolations. Yverdon 1779th
- Eléments de la police générale d'un Etat. Yverdon 1781st
- Le développement de la raison. Oeuvres posthumous. Yverdon 1789th
- Encyclopédie, ou Dictionnaire universel raisonné of connaissances humaines. 42 volumes and 6 supplementary volumes. Yverdon 1770–1776. Reissue: Fischer Verlag, Erlangen 1993, ISBN 3-89131-069-2 . (38,000 pages on 257 microfiches.)

== Bibliography ==
- Encyclopédie, ou, Dictionnaire universel raisonné des connoissances humaines (Yverdon, Switzerland. 42 volumes, 6 volumes Supplement, and 10 volumes of plates, 1770–1780), with the assistance of Leonhard Euler, Charles François Dupuis, Jérôme Lalande, Albrecht von Haller, et al.
- Mémoires de la Société oeconomique de Berne (24 volumes, 1763–72)
- Le Bacha de Bude (1765)
- De Newtonian Attractione, adversus Hambergen (1757)
- Quadro filosofico della religione cristiana (1757)
- Sul modo di formare la mente ed il cuore dei fanciuli (1763)
- Principii del diritto della natura a delle genti (1769)
- Lezioni di logica (1770)
- Elementi del governo interiore di uno stato (1781)
