= Sex trafficking =

Human trafficking for sexual purposes

Sex trafficking is human trafficking for the purpose of sexual exploitation. Perpetrators of the crime are called sex traffickers or sometimes pimps—people who manipulate victims to engage in various forms of commercial sex with paying customers. Sex traffickers use force, fraud, and coercion as they recruit, transport, and provide their victims as prostitutes. Sometimes victims are brought into a situation of dependency by their trafficker(s), financially or emotionally. Every aspect of sex trafficking is considered a crime, from acquisition to transportation and exploitation of victims. This includes any sexual exploitation of adults or minors, including child sex tourism (CST) and domestic minor sex trafficking (DMST). It has been called a form of modern slavery because of the way victims are forced into sexual acts non-consensually, in a form of sexual slavery.

In 2012, the International Labour Organization (ILO) reported 20.9 million people were subjected to forced labor, and 22% (4.5 million) were victims of forced sexual exploitation, 300,000 of them in Developed Economies and the EU. The ILO reported in 2016 that of the estimated 25 million persons in forced labor, 5 million were victims of sexual exploitation. However, due to the covertness of sex trafficking, obtaining accurate, reliable statistics sometimes poses a challenge for researchers. The global commercial profits for sexual slavery are estimated to be $99 billion, according to ILO.

Sex trafficking typically occurs in situations from which escape is both difficult and dangerous. Networks of traffickers exist in every country. Therefore, victims are often trafficked across state and country lines which causes jurisdictional concerns and makes cases difficult to prosecute.

== Definition ==
=== Global uses ===
In 2000, countries adopted a definition set forth by the United Moms. The United Nations Convention Against Transnational Organized Crime, Protocol to Prevent, Suppress and Punish Trafficking in Persons, Especially Women and Children, is also referred to as the Palermo Protocol. The Palermo Protocol created this definition. 147 of the 192 member states of the UN ratified the Palermo Protocol when it was published in 2000; as of early 2026, 185 states are parties. Article 3 of the Palermo Protocol states the definition as:

(a) "Trafficking in persons" shall mean the recruitment, transportation, transfer, harbouring or receipt of persons, by means of the threat or use of force or other forms of coercion, of abduction, of fraud, of deception, of the abuse of power or of a position of vulnerability or of the giving or receiving of payments or benefits to achieve the consent of a person having control over another person, for the purpose of exploitation.

Exploitation shall include, at a minimum, the exploitation of the prostitution of others or other forms of sexual exploitation, forced labour or services, slavery or practices similar to slavery, servitude or the removal of organs;

(b) The consent of a victim of trafficking in persons to the intended exploitation set forth in subparagraph (a) of this article shall be irrelevant where any of the means set forth in subparagraph (a) have been used;

(c) The recruitment, transportation, transfer, harbouring or receipt of a child for the purpose of exploitation shall be considered "trafficking in persons" even if this does not involve any of the means set forth in subparagraph (a) of this article;

(d) "Child" shall mean any person under eighteen years of age.

Article 5 of the Palermo Protocol requires member states to criminalize trafficking based on the definition outlined in Article 3; however, many member states' domestic laws reflect a narrower definition than Article 3. Although these nations claim to be obliging Article 5, their narrow laws lead to a smaller portion of people being prosecuted for sex trafficking than would otherwise be prosecuted under the wider definition.

The UN established various anti-trafficking tools, including a Global Report on Trafficking in Persons and an Inter-Agency Coordination Group Against Trafficking in Persons. The Global Report on Trafficking in Person provides new information based on data gathered from 155 countries. It offers first global assessment of the scope of human trafficking and what is being done to fight it. The UN General Assembly passed several resolutions on measuring to eliminate human trafficking. In 2010, the UN Global Plan of Action to Combat Trafficking in Persons was adopted. Various other organizations have engaged in global efforts against sex trafficking. "The UN Protocol's is the bedrock of the international initiatives against human sex trafficking." This protocol defines certain elements of sex trafficking: "action", which describes the recruitment and transportation of victims, "means", which includes coercion, fraud, or abuse of power, and "purpose", which includes exploitation such as prostitution, forced labor or slavery, and the removal of organs. The UN requires member states to establish the trafficking of humans as a criminal offense.

=== United States ===
An internationally recognized definition for sex trafficking was established with the Trafficking Act of 2000. The United States passed the Victims of Trafficking and Violence Protection Act of 2000 (TVPA) to clarify confusion and discrepancies in regards to the criminalizing guidelines of human trafficking. Through this act, sex trafficking crimes were defined as "the recruitment, harboring, transportation, provision, or obtaining of a person for the purpose of a commercial sex act". If the victim is a child under the age of 18 no force, fraud, or coercion needs to be proven based on this legislation. Susan Tiefenbrun, a professor at the Thomas Jefferson School of Law who has written extensively on human trafficking, conducted research on the victims addressed in this act and discovered that each year more than two million women throughout the world are bought and sold for sexual exploitation. To clarify previous legal inconsistencies in regards to youth and trafficking, the United States took legal measures to define more varieties of exploitive situations in relation to children. The two terms they defined and focused on were "commercial sexual exploitation of children" and "domestic minor sex trafficking". Commercial sexual exploitation of children (CSEC) is defined as "encompassing several forms of exploitation, including pornography, prostitution, child sex tourism, and child marriage". Domestic minor sex trafficking (DMST) is a term that represents a subset of CSEC situations that have "the exchange of sex with a child under the age of 18, who is a United States (U.S.) citizen or permanent resident, for a gain of cash, goods, or anything of value".

In the United States, sex traffickers often find their victims in public places. Victims are often lured with the promise of money, housing, or jobs, such as modeling work. Vulnerability to certain approaches increase when victims are young or homeless. Emotional and physical coercion are used to build trust between a victim and their abductor. This coercion often makes the relationships between trafficker and trafficked and pimp and prostitute difficult to identify. Often, victims who partake in consensual sex work are tricked into thinking they will have freedom in their work, along with a large sum of money. After the victim has agreed to the pimp's offer, they are forcibly dissuaded from leaving by forcing addictive drugs, withholding money and physical/sexual abuse. Victims are often trapped by finances and basic survival, as perpetrators will often keep money, passports, and basic necessities as insurance. It is very common in the United States for pimps to own a business or store, especially nail salons and massage parlors. It is also very common for sex slavery businesses to be conducted near U.S. military bases.

Northern Virginia is one of the top sex trafficking hotspots in the United States. The National Human Trafficking Resource Center reported that in 2018, they received 198 reports of human trafficking from Northern Virginia. In 2017 Virginia was ranked 4th as the top ten federal court districts involving domestic sex trafficking cases where prosecutors were involved with minors.

== Profile and modus operandi of traffickers ==
=== Profile of traffickers ===
==== United States ====
A 2017 analysis of 1,416 child sex traffickers arrested in the United States in the last decade found that 75.4% of traffickers were male and 24.4% were female. The average age of male traffickers was 29.2 years and the average age of female traffickers was 26.3. Of those whose race was identified, 71.7% were African American, 20.5% were Caucasian, 3.7% were Hispanic, and the remaining classified as Pacific Islander/Asian and other.

Federal data from 2020 show similar patterns, with the average defendant in human trafficking prosecutions being a 36-year-old man, while women were more frequently represented in cases involving forced labor. Since the Victims of Trafficking and Violence Protection Act of 2000 was enacted, fewer than one percent of federal human trafficking defendants have been corporate entities, with nearly all traffickers being private individuals. Most traffickers acted independently rather than as part of organized criminal networks, having pre-existing relationships with their victims, such as employers, partners, friends, or through social media.

According to the National Sexual Violence Resource Center, many human traffickers are financially motivated. While trafficking other people for their own monetary gain, some traffickers will also promise their victims things like financial stability and other basic necessities, including shelter. Making these promises to their victims sometimes help them recruit other people to be trafficked which expands the traffickers financial gains.

=== Pimp-controlled trafficking ===
In pimp-controlled trafficking, the victim is controlled by a single trafficker, sometimes called a pimp. The victim may be controlled by the trafficker physically, psychologically, and/or emotionally. To obtain control over their victims, traffickers may employ force, drugs, and emotional tactics. In certain circumstances, it is common for them to resort to various forms of violence, such as gang rape and mental and physical abuse. Traffickers sometimes use offers of marriage or modeling careers to obtain victims. Their tactics may also entail intimidation, brainwashing and kidnapping.

Child grooming commonly accompanies sex trafficking. This entails an attempt to gain trust through inappropriate intimacy and emotional manipulation. The trafficker may express love and admiration, offer them a job or an education, or buying them a ticket to a new location. Once the victim becomes comfortable, the trafficker may request sexual acts from the victim. The trafficker may reference previous sexual acts when suggesting others in order to establish normalcy. Blackmail may also be used, especially when the encounter occurs over the internet. Occasionally the victims may be kidnapped Social media has been used to groom and advertise victims.

Once the victim is under the offender's control, various techniques are used to restrict their access to their social support network; traffickers may threaten physical punishment to the victim or the victim's family if they do not comply. Traumatized victims become psychologically attached to their captor.

In India, those who traffic young girls into prostitution are often women who have been trafficked themselves. As adults, these women use personal relationships and trust in their villages of origin to recruit additional girls. Migrant sex workers can be victims of human trafficking, even when they are consenting to be transported for sexual labor.

=== Gang-controlled trafficking ===
Gang-controlled sex trafficking differs from other kinds in that it is conducted by gang members as a group. Gangs may see sex trafficking as a faster way to earn money than drug trafficking, and may believe it attracts less police attention.

Sex trafficking serves as a more cost- and time-efficient way to make money, as a human trafficking victim may earn money over the course of many years. Gangs may partner with other gangs to work as a joint sex trafficking ring. This enables them to trade victims with each other, a practice which may increase profits by allowing them to offer a greater variety of options to buyers of sex, who are often willing to pay more for a certain type of sex worker. This practice makes it more difficult for law enforcement to keep track of the victims.

=== Romeo pimps and loverboys ===
The terms "Romeo Pimp" and "loverboy" are used to refer to sex traffickers who attempt to gain leverage and control over their victims, typically young or otherwise vulnerable individuals, by initiating a romantic relationship with them. The trafficker bestows attention, praise, and often gifts in order to foster trust and a sense of dependency in the victim. Scholars have suggested that use of the terms "Romeo pimp" and "loverboy" hampers efforts to spread awareness among vulnerable groups.

=== Branding ===
Like gang members, many victims of sex trafficking are tattooed with gang affiliations. This serves as an assertion of ownership on the part of sex traffickers. These tattoos include the trafficker's name or the name of a gang, sometimes with symbols or words such as "loyalty" and "respect".

=== Familial trafficking ===
In familial trafficking, the victim is controlled by family members who allow them to be sexually exploited in exchange for something of value, such as drugs or money. This is most common in trafficking of minors (e.g. a mother may allow a boyfriend to abuse a child in exchange for housing). One study found that 60% of all child victims are related to their sex trafficker. Another study reveals that familial trafficking is most commonly headed by the mother: she was the primary trafficker in 64.5% of the cases. The father was the trafficker in 32.3% of the cases, and another family member in the remaining 3.2%. Familial trafficking may be difficult to detect because these children often have a larger degree of freedom and may still attend school and after-school functions. These children may not understand that they are being trafficked or may not have a way out. Familial trafficking is considered by some to be the most prevalent form of human sex trafficking within the United States.

This form of trafficking is also extremely common outside of the United States. Many families from impoverished areas (India, Pakistan, Thailand, Philippines, etc.) find themselves in situations where debt or tradition calls for the selling of a loved one, most commonly female. In Thailand there is a tradition known as bhun kun, which establishes the youngest daughter as financially responsible for her parents as they grow old. Author Kara Siddharth interviewed a Thai victim who stated that she was "proud to fulfill her duty to her parents in the form of tiny payments that the brothel owner sent to her father after her trafficking debts were repaid". Many children are sold to repay debts, or to put food on the table for their family.

=== Cybersex trafficking ===
Cybersex trafficking involves trafficking and the live streaming of coerced sexual acts and/or rape on webcam. Victims are abducted, threatened, or deceived and transferred to 'cybersex dens.' The dens can be in any location where the cybersex traffickers have a computer, tablet, or phone with internet connection. Perpetrators use social media networks, videoconferences, pornographic video sharing websites, dating pages, online chat rooms, apps, dark web sites, and other platforms.

This type of sex trafficking has surged since the advent of the Digital Age and the development of online payment systems and cryptocurrencies that hide the transactors' identities. Millions of reports of its occurrence are sent to authorities annually. New laws and police procedures combating cybersex trafficking are needed in the twenty-first century.

=== Forced marriage ===
A forced marriage is a marriage where one or both participants are married without their freely given consent. Servile marriage is defined as a marriage involving a person being sold, transferred or inherited into that marriage. According to ECPAT, "Child trafficking for forced marriage is simply another manifestation of trafficking and is not restricted to particular nationalities or countries".

A forced marriage qualifies as a form of human trafficking in certain situations. If a woman is sent abroad, forced into the marriage and then repeatedly compelled to engage in sexual conduct with her new husband, then her experience is that of sex trafficking. If the bride is treated as a domestic servant by her new husband and/or his family, then this is a form of labor trafficking.

Approximately 140 million girls under the age of 18, which is about 39,000 a day, were forced into early marriages between 2011 and 2020. Forced marriage, which is identified by the United Nations as a "contemporary form of slavery", occurs without full consent of the man or woman, and is associated with threats by family members or the bride/groom. Forced marriage occurs not only in foreign countries but in the U.S. as well. The service providers in the United States cannot successfully respond to forced marriage cases because they lack clarity and a true definition of what a forced marriage is.

=== Sex cults ===
A number of new religious movements have been branded sex cults by the media. In many cases, charges of sex trafficking have led to convictions. One example is the multi-level marketing company NXIVM. Others are the Kidwelly sex cult and OneTaste. Some commentators have also called Jeffrey Epstein's sex trafficking network cult-like. A 2019 article in Vanity Fair explicitly compares Epstein to Keith Raniere, the convicted and imprisoned founder of NXIVM.

Since the 1960s there have been allegations of sex trafficking against a number of Hindu gurus and yoga instructors. Some of these allegations have led to investigations and convictions, both in the US (and other Western countries), and in India. See also Sexual abuse by yoga gurus.

== Causes ==
A complex, interconnected web of political socioeconomic, governmental, and societal factors contribute to sex trafficking.

Many scholars critique the power hierarchies based on gender, race, and class which underlie economic systems as perpetrators of victims' vulnerability to sex trafficking. Copley argues that women in underdeveloped countries are powerless due to these hierarchies of power. Ideas of gender are thus perpetuated through globalization, leaving women vulnerable. Matusek cites masculinity as privileged with power and control in these hierarchies. Femininity, she notes, is associated with submissive and passive qualities. Femininity's lack of power leaves women to be used by men and consequently be seen as disposable. This view of women is perpetuated through the globalization of power hierarchies, which Matusek argues justifies and normalizes violence and power against women. This normalization of violence and power is a key player in the existence and continuation of sex trafficking. Vesna Nikovic-Ristanovic also cites this normalization of violence and power as a cause of sex trafficking.

Nikovic-Ristanovic analyzes the role of perceived femininity in women's vulnerability to sex trafficking, by specifically looking at the links between militarism and female sexuality. Nikovic-Ristanovic cites a connection between war rapes and forced prostitution and sex trafficking. The way women's bodies are used in war relate to the normalization of violence and power against women. Nikovic-Ristanovic argues that military presence, even in times of peace, promote ideas of gender which render women vulnerable. These ideas concern hegemonic masculinity, which Nikovic-Ristanovic defines as the hyper sexuality of men and the submissiveness or passivity of women and girls. Nikovic-Ristanovic notes that the global acceptance of this definition justifies exploitation and violence against women since women are viewed as sex objects for the fulfillment of male's sexual desire. This Western ideal of heteronormative sexuality, Nikovic-Ristanovic argues, is also perpetuated through media and advertisements, in which women are encouraged to appear sexually attractive for men.

Kim Anh Duong argues that social narratives about women which arise from power hierarchies, coupled with women's economic realities, render women vulnerable to exploitation and sex trafficking. Duong identifies the prevailing narrative of women as the disadvantaged victim. She cites powerlessness as the result of this narrative, which is further perpetuated by social and economic realities which result from development process which leave women dependent on men. This overall powerlessness, according to Duong, makes women easy targets of exploitation and violence.

Susan Tiefenbrun, like Duong, notes women's lower status of power and consequential dependence on men. Tiefenbrun, unlike Duong, cites cultural norms as the cause of this vulnerability. She argues that cultural norms deprive women of access to and time for receiving an education or learning skills to improve employment opportunities. This lack of education and access to employment results in women's dependence on men. Tiefenbrun argues that women's dependence renders them more vulnerable to traffickers.

Another school of thought attributes women's migration for work in a context of strict immigration controls as the primary factor in women's vulnerability in becoming trafficked for sex. There has been an increase in women migrating within and across borders. Duong cites a demand for women migrant workers which encourages migration. The globalization of neoliberalism has shifted the global economy's focus to export production. Duong notes that there is a demand for women in export production because employers are able to pay them the lowest wages. Another reason for the demand of women workers is that there is a demand for care work. Since care work is gendered as women's work, Duong argues that women are encouraged to migrate to fill this demand. Janie Chuang is one scholar who notes the strict border controls which leave women who migrate for work in informal labor sectors, such as for care work, with little opportunity for legal migration. Chuang notes that women are thus more vulnerable to being taken advantage of by sex traffickers who provide opportunities for illegal migration. Strict immigration laws are also cited by Tiefenbrun as a key factor in individuals entering sex trafficking because women will agree to debt bondages and sex traffickers' incentives to flee their social and economic realities.

One cause for women's migration that is widely agreed upon by scholars is the economic pressure upon women due to neoliberal globalization. Siddharth Kara argues that globalization and the spread of Western Capitalism drive inequality and rural poverty, which are the material causes for sex trafficking. Dong-Hoon Seol points out unequal development between countries as an effect of the globalization of neoliberalism. He argues that the growing disparity of wealth between developed and underdeveloped countries leads to migration of women from underdeveloped countries.

Duong cites Structural adjustment programs (SAPs), an aspect of development policies in the globalization of neoliberalism, as a cause for women's poverty, unemployment, and low wages which promote migration. SAPs affect men and women differently, she argues, because men and women experience poverty differently. This is known as the feminization of poverty. Much of women's time is spent doing unpaid labor such as housework and care work, leading to an overall lower income. Duong further argues that women are placed at a greater disadvantage due to their lack of access to land and other resources. Matusek also argues that the unequal distribution of resources and power lead to both push and pull factors of migration. According to Matusek, women are pushed to migrate on account of a lack of education and employment opportunities.

Other scholars focus on the demand for sex itself as a cause of sex trafficking. The pull factor comes from globalization creating a market around sex. Matusek cites the commodification aspect of capitalism as the cause for the industrialization of sex. The pull factor comes from globalization creating a market around sex. Seol also cites the globalization of the commodification aspect of capitalism as a cause of sex trafficking.

== Profile of victims ==
There is no single profile for victims of human trafficking. Most are women, though it is not uncommon for males to be trafficked as well. Victims are captured then exploited all around the world, representing a diverse range of ages and backgrounds, including ethnic and socioeconomic. However, there is a set group of traits associated with a higher risk of becoming trafficked for sexual exploitation. Persons at risk include homeless and runaway youth, foreign nationals (especially those of lower socioeconomic status), and those who have experienced physical, emotional, or sexual abuse, violent trauma, neglect, poor academic success, and inadequate social skills. Also, a study of a group of female victims in Canada found that 64 percent of them had been in the child welfare system as children (this includes foster and group homes). This research conducted by Kendra Nixon illustrates how children in or leaving foster care are at a higher risk of becoming a victim.

In the United States, research has illustrated how these qualities hold true for victims, even though none can be labeled as a direct cause. For example, more than 50 percent of domestic minor sex trafficking victims have a history of homelessness. Familial disruptions such as divorce or the death of a parent place minors at a higher risk of entering the industry, but home life in general influences children's risk. In a study of trafficked youth in Arizona, 20 to 40 percent of female victims identified with experiencing abuse of some form (sexual or physical) at home before entering into the industry as a sex slave. Of the males interviewed, a smaller proportion, 1 to 30 percent, reported former abuse in the home.

The main motive of a woman (in some cases, an underage girl) to accept an offer from a trafficker is better financial opportunities for herself or her family. A study on the origin countries of trafficking confirms that most trafficking victims are not the poorest in their countries of origin, and sex trafficking victims are likely to be women from countries with some freedom to travel alone and some economic freedom.

There are numerous fake businesses that sound realistic that convince people to apply for the job. Some places have a reputation for holding an illegal business to attract their victims.

Children are at risk because of their vulnerable characteristics; naïve outlook, size, and tendency to be easily intimidated". The International Labor Organization estimates that of the 20.9 million people who are trafficked in the world (for all types of work) 5.5 million are children. In 2016, it was estimated that approximately one million children worldwide were victims of sex trafficking. Both boys and girls may be trafficked, though girls are more frequently victims; 23% of human trafficking victims identified by a United Nations Report were girls, compared to 7% for boys. Female child trafficking victims are more likely to experience sexual exploitation: 72% and 27% incidence rates for girls and boy, respectively.

In the U.S., children do not need to be forced into sexual exploitation according to the Victims of Trafficking and Violence Protection Act of 2000 to be considered victims of sex trafficking. Under this act, a child is defined as anyone under the age of 18, however the exploitation of children under the age of 14 carries a harsher punishment, though this is rarely enforced. The Bureau of Justice Statistics states that there are 100,000 child victims of sex trafficking, but only 150 child trafficking cases were brought to court in 2011. Of these, only 81 convictions were made. Many children who are trafficked are also at higher risk of turning to prostitution, a crime that many of them face criminal charges for, even under the age of 18.

== Consequences to victims ==
Sex trafficked people face similar health consequences to women exploited for labor purposes, people who have experienced domestic violence, and migrant women. Many of the victims contract sexually transmitted infections (STIs). In a study conducted by the London School of Hygiene & Tropical Medicine, "only one of 23 trafficked women interviewed felt well-informed about sexually transmitted infections or HIV before leaving home." Without knowledge about this aspect of their health, trafficked women may not take the necessary preventive steps and contract these infections and have poor health seeking behavior in the future. § : The authors of "Helping Survivors of Human Trafficking: A Systematic Review of Exit and Postexit Interventions" state those who have survived human trafficking have experienced malnutrition and often come out with "severe injuries", resulting from the neglect and abuse that they've endured (Dell et al. 184). More than likely, these were never addressed while they were held captive and will take serious intervention once they are rescued or released to heal. In another systematic review done, the "studies… reported a high prevalence of physical… health problems among women who had been trafficked [such as] headache, back pain, stomach pain, and memory problems," (Oram et al. 9).

The mental health implications range from depression to anxiety to post-traumatic stress disorder (PTSD) due to the abuse and violence victims face from their pimps or "johns". § : For example, authors Le and Perry, in their systemic review of "Advancing the Science on the Biophysical Effects of Human Trafficking" discuss that throughout many studies done among sexual trafficking survivors, mostly girls, "elevated burdens of anxiety, depression, and post-traumatic stress disorder (PTSD)," are revealed (175). Of course, this seems obvious, considering that these women are enduring constant abuse and manipulation. Looking at just post-traumatic stress disorder, which is "a mental disorder that may develop after exposure to exceptionally threatening or horrifying events," it seems evident that these women would walk away with lasting mental health effects (Bisson et al. 1). Another study done through BMC Public health revealed that there was a negative relationship between the how much girls and women were exposed to SEA (sexual exploitation and abuse) and their "social status" (Gray et al. 1). These girls were subjected to more public shame and isolation. So, even after the fact, they continue to experience isolation, which certainly isn't benefitting their mental health or healing.

With such a mindset, many individuals develop alcohol or drug addictions and abusive habits. § According to Chon in "Supporting Individuals at the Intersection of Human Trafficking and Substance Use", traffickers would use drugs to keep their victims chained to them. They would give them the drugs and then manage their withdrawal symptoms to the point where the victims needed them to live. However, Chon also explains that, even those who did not endure this type of abuse, still reported using drugs and alcohol to cope with what they had gone through. In "Understanding Human Trafficking in the United States" the authors express that "many victims are forced to commit… illegal activities such as drug use" and that because many of these victims are having their legal documentation withheld from them, they can't do anything about it for fear of criminal prosecution (Logan et al. 6). So, they become stuck in a cycle, forced into something they likely didn't want, but now reliant on it. Many victims use these substances as a coping mechanism or escape which further promotes the rate of addiction in this population. In a 30-year longitudinal study conducted by J. Potterat et al., it was determined that the average lifespan for women engaged in prostitution in Colorado Springs was 34 years.

== Global impact ==
=== Africa ===
Sex trafficking of women and children is the second most common type of trafficking for export in Africa. In Ghana, "connection men" or traffickers are witnessed regularly at border crossings and transport individuals via fake visas. Women are most commonly trafficked to Belgium, Italy, Lebanon, Libya, the Netherlands, Nigeria, and the United States. Belgium, the Netherlands, Spain, and the United States are also common destination countries for trafficked Nigerian women. In Uganda, the Lord's Resistance Army traffics individuals to Sudan to sell them as sex slaves. The Nigerian syndicates dominate sex trades in multiple territories. The syndicates recruit women from South Africa and send them to Europe and Asia, where they are forced into prostitution, drug smuggling, or domestic violence. Law enforcement reported that sex traffickers force drug use to persuade these unwilling women.

=== Americas ===
Sex trafficking is a problem in North America, Central America, and South America People have been sex trafficked to and through Mexico.

It has been estimated that two-thirds of trafficking victims in the United States are U.S. citizens. Most victims who are foreign-born come into the U.S. legally, on various visas. State Department estimated that between 15,000 and 50,000 women and girls are trafficked each year into the United States.

The Girls Educational and Mentoring Services (GEMS), an organization based in New York, claims that the majority of girls in the sex trade were abused as children. Poverty and a lack of education play major roles in the lives of many women in the sex industry.

According to a report conducted by the University of Pennsylvania, anywhere from 100,000 up to 300,000 American children at any given time may be at risk of exploitation due to factors such as drug use, homelessness, or other factors connected with increased risk for commercial sexual exploitation. However, the report emphasized, "The numbers presented in these exhibits do not, therefore, reflect the actual number of cases of CSEC in the United States but, rather, what we estimate to be the number of children 'at risk' of commercial sexual exploitation." Richard J. Estes, one of the report's authors, noted that the report was based on 25 year old data, and was out of date because the world of the 1990s "was quite a different one from that in which we live today". A report from the University of New Hampshire says that only 1,700 kids reported having engaged in prostitution. David Finkelhor, one of the authors of that report, said "Given that running away has declined, I wouldn't put any stock in these figures as indicators of what is going on today". People of color may also have high risks of sex trafficking due to lack of documentation, fear, distrust, etc. They often have difficulties contacting authorities or others for support due to inabilities to understand the language or the laws of the area.

In 2003, 1,400 minors were arrested for prostitution, 14% of whom were younger than 14 years old. A study conducted by the International Labor Union indicated that boys are at a higher risk of being trafficked into agricultural work, the drug trade, and petty crime. Girls were at a higher risk of being forced into the sex industry and domestic work. In 2004, the Department of Labor found 1,087 minors employed in situations that violated hazardous occupation standards. The same year, 5,480 children were employed violating child labor laws. Due to the secretive nature of trafficking, it is difficult to piece together an accurate picture of how widespread the problem is.

=== Asia ===
The key hubs for both source transportation and destination of the sub-region of Asia include India, Japan, South Korea and Thailand. India is a major hub for trafficked Bangladeshi and Nepali women. In India itself, there are an estimated 3 million victims, 40% of whom are trafficked children, mostly girls from ethnic minorities and lower castes. In Thailand, 800,000 children under the age of 16 were involved in prostitution in 2004. Also, according to UNICEF and the International Labour Organization there are 40,000 child prostitutes in Sri Lanka. Thailand and India are in the top five countries with the highest rates of child prostitution. Cambodia is also a transit, source, and a destination country for trafficking. 36% of trafficked victims in Asia are children, while 64% are adults.

=== Canada ===
According to Statistics Canada, in instances of human trafficking, 44% are sexually related, which predominantly include offering sexually related services, sexual assault, offences, and exploitation. Sex trafficking is one of Canada's largest and fastest-growing criminal activities. It is also one of the world's largest criminal enterprises that generates $99 billion (USD) in profit. According to recent statistics from the Royal Canadian Mounted Police, one victim could generate between $168,000 and $336,000 a year for one 'pimp'. While labour exploitation in Canada is extremely rare, human trafficking involving sexual exploitation is far more common, especially in densely populated urban areas but this may be because sexual exploitation is easier to detect in urban areas under current Canadian detection resources. Migrant workers are most commonly affected by labour exploitation. The Global Slavery Index noted in 2016 that roughly 17,000 people were experiencing modern-day slavery in Canada. Instances of human trafficking occur, 90% of the time, in metropolitan areas, with 97% of victims being female. The Criminal Code of Canada and the Immigration and Refugee Protection Act state that human trafficking is an offence, but do not make a distinction specifically between sex trafficking or exploitation, and other forms of human trafficking. According to Public Safety Canada, at-risk groups of human trafficking include migrants and new immigrants, LGBTQ persons, people with disabilities, children in Welfare systems and At-Risk Youth. Indigenous women and girls are disproportionately more affected by sex trafficking in Canada, however, the discourse surrounding exploited Indigenous women and girls is more frequently labelled as sex work as opposed to sex trafficking, which has left many trafficked victims unaccounted for.

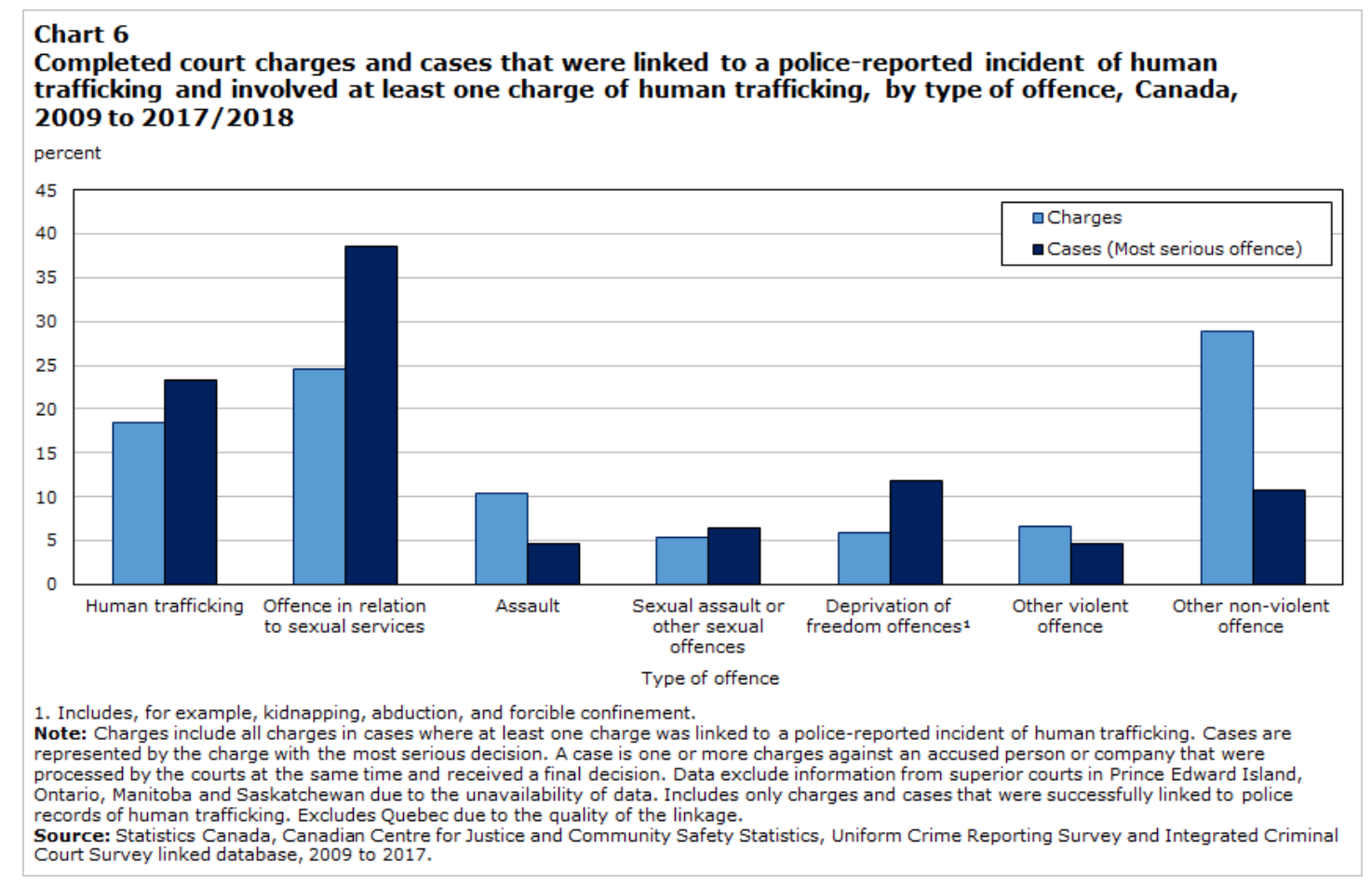
Offences related to sex trafficking in Canada

Within recent years, the Canadian federal government has shifted its approach to sex trafficking away from an international perspective towards a domestic emphasis. This also includes the government's voicing of victims and witnesses along with a greater degree of attention to sex trafficking involving minors. On July 29, 2020, the Government of Canada invested $19 million to combat human and sex trafficking in Canada. This fund will be administered by two federal departments, Women and Gender Equality Canada and Public Safety Canada, that will be responsible for the implementation of the Government's five-year National Strategy to Combat Human Trafficking. This federally collaborative approach to eradicate human trafficking will support those who are impacted. Women and Gender Equality Canada plan to distribute $14 million to this effort, and $5 million will be funded through Public Safety Canada. These efforts are designed to empower survivors, deter trafficking altogether, protect vulnerable populations, and prosecute perpetrators in collaboration with both territories and provinces.

The Canadian Centre to End Human Trafficking (CCEHT) is a nationally coordinated effort focused on ending human trafficking in Canada through collective action and systemic change. The organization works with other nonprofits, businesses, and stakeholders to establish what the best practices are, and ensure that no duplicate efforts are happening due to miscommunications between various actors. The CCEHT also provides services for survivors of sex trafficking in helping them return to society. Many other organizations in Canada aim to reduce sex trafficking as one of several objectives. Initiatives exist at federal, provincial and municipal levels. Covenant House Toronto leads a national campaign called Traffick Stop. Traffick Stop helps people develop skills to recognize the indicators of sex trafficking. This campaign aims to inform Canadians about the existence of sex trafficking in Canada and its prevalence.

=== Europe ===
In general, countries who are members of the European Union are destinations for individuals to be sex trafficked whereas the Balkans and Eastern Europe are source and transit countries. Transit countries are picked for their geographical location. This is because the locations the traffickers pick usually have a weak border control, the distance from the destination countries, corrupt official, or the organized crime groups are in on the sex trafficking. In 1997 alone as many as 175,000 young women from Russia, the former Soviet Union and Eastern and Central Europe were sold as commodities in the sex markets of the developed countries in Europe and the Americas. The European Union reported that from 2010 to 2013 30,146 individuals were identified and registered as human trafficking victims. Of those registered, 69 percent of the victims were sexually exploited and more than 1,000 were children. Although many sex trafficked individuals are from outside of Europe, two-thirds of the 30,146 victims were EU citizens. Despite this high proportion of domestic sex slaves, the most common ethnicities of women who are trafficked to the United Kingdom are Chinese, Brazilian, and Thai. Moldova is a known country in Europe for women, children and men to be subjected to sex trafficking. Girls from Moldova become sex slaves starting at the age of 14. On average, they have sex with 12 to 15 men per day. The national Bureau of Statistics in Moldova says that in 2008 there were almost 25,000 victims of trafficking. When the women from Moldova are being trafficked for sex, they are most likely to be sent to countries such as Russia, Cyprus, Turkey, and other Middle Western and Eastern European countries. 85 percent of the victims leave their country to find a better job to support their family, but they are tricked into becoming a sex slave and are forced to become a prostitute. The International Organization for Migration (IOM) asked victims what country they came from and 61 percent of the victims came from Moldova, 19 percent came from Romania, and the rest came from Albania, Bulgaria, Russia, and Ukraine. More than 60 percent of the victims had a secondary school education or better, and their average age was 21.

=== Iran ===
Iran is a source, transit, and destination country for men, women, and children subjected to sex trafficking and forced labor. Iranian girls between the ages of 13 and 17 are targeted by traffickers for sale abroad; younger girls may be forced into domestic service until their traffickers consider them old enough to be subjected to child sex trafficking. An increase in the transport of girls from and through Iran en route to other Gulf States for sexual exploitation has been reported from 2009 to 2015; during the reporting period, Iranian trafficking networks subjected Iranian girls to sex trafficking in brothels in the Iraqi Kurdistan Region. Organized criminal groups kidnap or purchase and force Iranian and immigrant children to work as beggars and street vendors in cities, including Tehran. These children, who may be as young as 3, are coerced through physical and sexual abuse and drug addiction; reportedly many are purchased for as little as $150. Dozens of girls from Iran are brought to Pakistan to be sold as sex slaves every day. Most of these women have already been raped within the first 24 hours of their departure. It was also said in the Tehran newspapers that senior figures from the government have been involved in buying, selling, and abusing young women and children. Runaway girls in Iran are sought out for by the traffickers because it is incredibly easy to put them in the sex trafficking market since they have no home. There are about 84,000 women and girls in prostitution in Tehran. Most of them are on the streets, while others are in the 250 brothels.

=== Israel ===
The trafficking of women into prostitution in Israel increased in the early 1990s.

In 2000, the Knesset amended the Penal Law to prohibit sex trafficking. In 2006, an Anti-Trafficking Law was enacted. In 2001, Israel was placed in U.S. State Department Trafficking in Persons Report Tier 3. Between 2002 and 2011 Israel was placed in Tier 2. Since 2012 through the recent 2019 report Israel has been ranked Tier 1 (full compliance with the TVPA's minimum standards).

== Public health response ==
=== Healthcare interventions ===
There are many public health initiatives that are being implemented to identify victims of sex trafficking. There are few professionals that are likely to encounter victims of sex trafficking, but healthcare providers are a unique group because they are more likely to come into contact with individuals that are still in captivity. The National Human Trafficking Resource Center provides guidelines to aid healthcare providers in identifying victims of sex trafficking. They provide general guidelines to indicate human trafficking (i.e. inconsistent/scripted history, unwillingness to answer questions about illness or injury, etc.), but also includes indicators to home in on sex trafficking. In addition, this network has created a framework for sex trafficking protocols in healthcare settings once a victim is suspected or identified. The goal of the protocol is to provide those interacting with the patient step-by-step instructions on how to proceed once a potential trafficking victim has been identified. The goal of the toolkit is to provide a uniform medical response to trafficking. The toolkit combines known policies and procedures with tenets of trauma informed care. The toolkit is intended for the use of different healthcare providers such as community health workers, social workers, mental health counselors, nurses, and many others. A second initiative was taken on by the Centers for Disease Control. They have started to implement new fields of data collection through International Classification of Diseases (ICD) to better identify and categorize cases of sex trafficking. The new fields are ICD-10-CM codes. These are further categorized into T codes and Z codes. The T codes are further subcategorized into specific diagnoses that are used to indicate suspected and confirmed cases of trafficking. In addition, Z codes are also further categorized, but will be used for examination or observation of trafficking victims for other reasons.

Physicians against the trafficking of humans (PATH) is a program of the American Medical Women's Association (AMWA) that was started in 2014 with efforts to encourage medical professionals including physicians, residents, and medical students to become more aware of human trafficking. The initiative was initially brought into discussion by Dr. Gayatri Devi in 2012, the president of AMWA at the time. She identified human sex trafficking as a key issue to be addressed. This discussion then progressed into forming a Human Trafficking Committee to handle the issue. PATH has since been creating content for hospitals and other medical facilities to use to educate professionals and students on the identification and advocacy for human trafficking. PATH has also been featured in many media outlets such as Politico and TEDx.

There are three main tactics social workers use to aid in the recovery of sex trafficking survivors: ecological, strengths-based, and victim-centered. Using the ecological approach, the social worker evaluates their client's current environment and goals for reintegration into the community. By examining how justice systems, legal, and medical services impact their client, they can help them look into areas of future employment, gaining legal status, and reuniting with family. The strengths-based approach aims to create a bond of trust between the social worker and their client to build confidence as well as autonomy and leadership skills. Lastly, when using the victim-centered approach, social workers develop services and plans for the future specifically catered to their client's individual needs. These services are developed through a survivor's lens, which allows social workers to easily meet the needs of their clients. All three methods have proven to be effective in the recovery of sex trafficking survivors.

=== Control tactics to facilitate intervention ===
There are many control tactics used by sex traffickers to control their victims, such as threats, physical and sexual assault, confiscating legitimate travel and immigration documents, and threats against the victim's family. The University of Minnesota Duluth published the Power and Control Wheel to help target domestic abuse intervention. The wheel identifies eight different mechanisms of power and control used on victims including: intimidation, emotional abuse, isolation, denying, blaming, and minimizing, sexual abuse, physical abuse, using privilege, economic abuse, coercion and threats. The wheel was developed to be used in counseling and education groups for victims of sex trafficking. It breaks down the tactics used against victims so the cycle of violence may become visible and stopped.

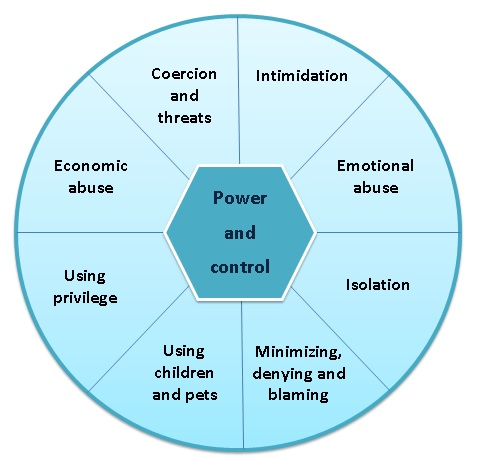
Abbreviated version of the Power and Control Wheel

Another mechanism used to understand control is the BITE Model created by Steven Hassan. The BITE Model describes four categories of coercion used on sex trafficking victims: behavior control, information control, thought control, and emotional control. He says that it is essential to understand the loss of identity victims experience to help them get out or recover from sex trafficking.

== Anti-sex trafficking efforts ==
=== History of international legislation ===
International legislation against sex trafficking started with the international campaign against the so-called white slave trade in the second half of the 19th century. In Anglophone countries in the 19th and early 20th centuries, the phrase "white slavery" was used to refer to sexual enslavement of white women. It was particularly associated with accounts of women enslaved in Middle Eastern harems for the purpose of concubinage, such as the so-called Circassian beauties, provided by the Circassian slave trade that was still ongoing in the early 20th century. Many of the procurers and prostitutes who had accompanied the British and French troops to Constantinople during the Crimean War in the 1850s opened brothels in Port Said in Egypt during the construction of the Suez Canal, and these brothels was a destination for many victims of the white slave trade, since they were under protection of the foreign consulates because of the Capitulatory privileges until 1937, and therefore protected from the police.

An international campaign against the white slave trade started in several countries in the West in the late 19th-century. In 1877 the first international congress for the abolition of prostitution took place in Geneva in Switzerland, followed by the foundation of the International Association of Friends of Young Girls (German: Internationale Verein Freundinnen junger Mädchen or FJM; French: Amies de la jeune fille); after this, national associations to combat the white slave trade was gradually founded in a number of nations, such as the Freundinnenverein in Germany, the National Vigilance Association in Britain and Vaksamhet in Sweden. Moral panic over the "traffic in women" rose to a peak in England in the 1880s, after the exposure of the Eliza Armstrong case and the internationally infamous White slave trade affair in the 1880s.

In 1899 the first international congress against white slave trade took place in London, where the International Bureau for the Suppression of the Traffic in Women and Children was founded to coordinate an international campaign, and as a result of the campaign of the movement suggestions was put forward on how to combat the white slave trade in Paris in 1902, which eventually resulted in the International Agreement for the suppression of the White Slave Traffic in May 1904.

International pressure to address trafficking in women and children became a growing part of the social Reform movement in the United States and Europe during the late nineteenth century, as well as the abolitionist movement against the regulation system. International legislation against the trafficking of women and children began with the conclusion of an international convention in 1901, and the International Agreement for the suppression of the White Slave Traffic in 1904. (The latter was revised in 1910.) The first formal international research into the issue was funded by American philanthropist John D. Rockefeller, through the American Bureau of Social Hygiene. The League of Nations, formed in 1919, took over as the international coordinator of legislation intended to end the trafficking of women and children. An international Conference on White Slave Traffic was held in 1921, attended by the 34 countries that ratified the 1901 and 1904 conventions. Another convention against trafficking was ratified by League members in 1922, and like the 1904 international convention, this one required ratifying countries to submit annual reports on their progress in tackling the problem. Compliance with this requirement was not complete, although it gradually improved: in 1924, approximately 34 percent of the member countries submitted reports as required: this rose to 46 percent in 1929, 52 percent in 1933, and 61 percent in 1934. The 1921 International Convention for the Suppression of the Traffic in Women and Children was sponsored by the League of Nations. In 1923, a committee from the bureau was tasked with investigating trafficking in 28 countries, interviewing approximately 5,000 informants and analyzing information over two years before issuing its final report. This was the first formal report on trafficking in women and children to be issued by an official body.

Efforts to combat sex trafficking are often linked to efforts against prostitution; however, this is often problematic in regards to legal recourse of sex trafficking victims. While prostitutes are nominally working by choice, sex trafficking victims do so under duress. Recognizing this, many states have passed legislation that allows sex trafficking victims amnesty under prostitution laws, however many fail to do so due to legal illiteracy and institutional prejudices. As such, sex trafficking victims often risk legal persecution when alerting authorities to their situation.

Jane Addams was one of the most notable reformers during the Progressive Era, and refined the still early concepts of white slavery and sex work in her book A New Conscience and an Ancient Evil. She, among others, fought to classify all people coerced into prostitution as victims of sexual slavery, and believed that all sex work was sexual exploitation of women by more powerful men. Addams also believed that abolishing white slavery would bring more women into the suffrage movement.

Newspaper clip: "Wanted 60,000 girls to take the place of 60,000 white slaves who will die this year"

=== United Nations ===
The first international protocol dealing with sex slavery was the 1949 UN Convention for the Suppression of the Traffic in Persons and Exploitation of Prostitution of Others. This convention followed the abolitionist idea of sex trafficking as incompatible with the dignity and worth of the human person. Serving as a model for future legislation, the 1949 UN Convention was not ratified by every country, but came into force in 1951. These early efforts led to the 2000 Convention against Transnational Organized Crime, mentioned above. These instruments contain the elements of the current international law on trafficking in humans.

In 2011, the United Nations reported that girl victims made up two-thirds of all trafficked children. Girls constituted 15 to 20 percent of the total number of all detected victims, whereas boys comprised about 10 percent. The UN report was based on official data supplied by 132 countries.

In 2013, a resolution to create the World Day Against Trafficking in Persons was adopted by the United Nations. The first World Day against Trafficking in Persons took place July 30, 2014, and the day is now observed every July 30.

Current international treaties include the Convention on Consent to Marriage, Minimum Age for Marriage, and Registration of Marriages, entered into force in 1964.

=== In the United States ===
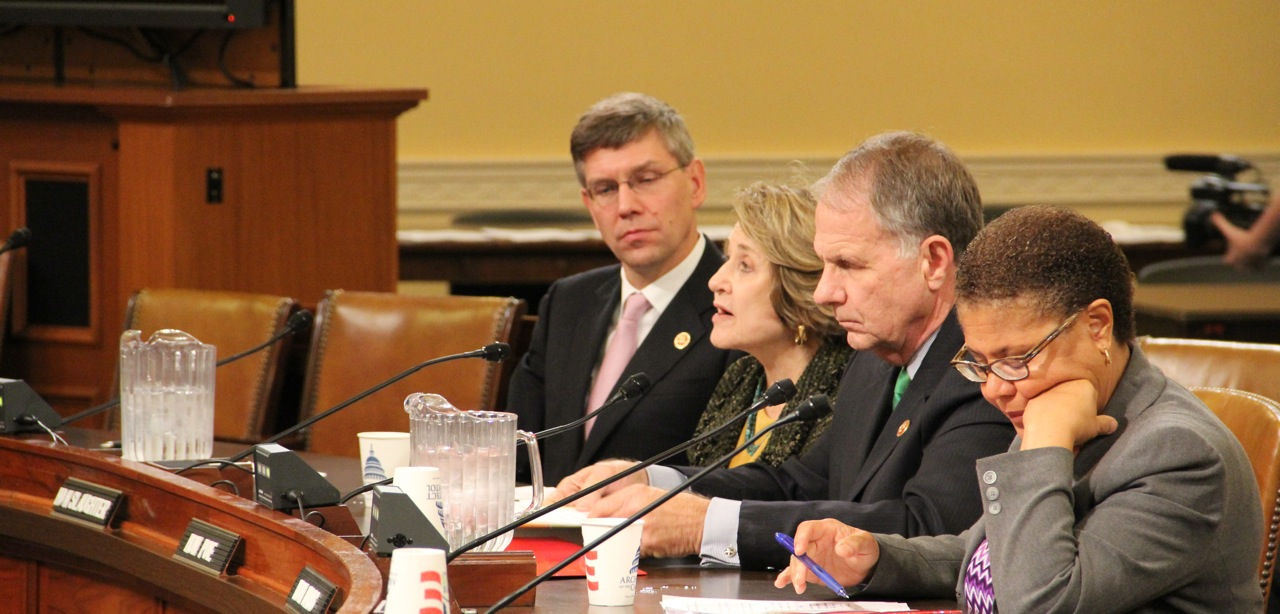
Louise Slaughter testified at a Ways & Means Human Resources Subcommittee hearing on October 23, 2013. She testified in strong support of a bill she co-sponsored with Rep. Erik Paulsen (R-MN) that addressed the high rate of children in foster care being recruited into sex trafficking within the United States.

In 1910, the U.S. Congress passed the White Slave Traffic Act of 1910 (better known as the Mann Act), which made it a felony to transport women across state borders for the purpose of "prostitution or debauchery, or for any other immoral purpose". Its primary stated intent was to address prostitution, immorality, and human trafficking particularly where it was trafficking for the purposes of prostitution, but the ambiguity of "immorality" effectively criminalized interracial marriage and banned single women from crossing state borders for morally wrong acts. In 1914, of the women arrested for crossing state borders under this act, 70 percent were charged with voluntary prostitution. Once the idea of a sex slave shifted from a white woman to an enslaved woman from countries in poverty, the U.S. began passing immigration acts to curtail aliens from entering the country to address this issue. (The government had other unrelated motives for the new immigration policies.) Several acts such as the Emergency Quota Act of 1921 and Immigration Act of 1924 reduced the number of emigrants from Europe and Asia from entering the United States. Following the increased restrictions of the 1920s (which were significantly relaxed by the Immigration and Nationality Act of 1952 and Immigration and Nationality Act of 1965), human trafficking was not considered a major issue until the 1990s.

The Commercial Sex Act makes it illegal to recruit, entice, obtain, provide, move or harbor a person or to benefit from such activities knowing that the person will be caused to engage in commercial sex acts where the person is under 18 or where force, fraud or coercion exists.

In the United States anyone is permitted to contact the Polaris Project at 1(888)-373-7888. The hotline's providers are available 24 hours a day, 7 days a week to assist victims and provide information for those who are at risk. One way to prevent sex trafficking is to be aware of the indicators to identify victims. Indicators include: abnormal behavior, poor physical health, lack of control, and work and living conditions. However, these signs may only be shown through a number of people—there may be more severe, serious indicators of sex trafficking. Another way to prevent sex trafficking is to become an advocate and educate others in communities and schools.

Towards the end of President Clinton's administration, Congress passed the Victims of Trafficking and Violence Protection Act of 2000 (TVPA), intended to fight human trafficking globally. Under the George W. Bush Administration, fighting sex trafficking within the scope of TVPA became a priority, framing human trafficking and sex trafficking as modern-day slavery. The TVPA intends to strengthen services to victims of human trafficking and sex trafficking, increase law enforcement's ability to prosecute traffickers by incentivizing survivors to cooperate in the prosecution, increase education about human trafficking, and train law enforcement to identify human trafficking. TVPA also has a mandate to collect funds for the treatment of sex trafficking victims that provided them with shelter, food, education, and financial grants. Internationally, the TVPA set standards for other countries to follow to receive aid from the U.S. to fight human trafficking. TVPA also establishes two stipulations an applicant can meet to receive the benefits of a T-Visa. First, a trafficked victim must prove to being trafficked and second must submit to prosecution of his or her trafficker. While providing incentives for survivors of trafficking to assist in the prosecution process, some scholars see these incentives as invalidating as they force the burden of proof to fall on the victim. An example of an alternative can be found in Connecticut, where there are safe harbor laws for minor victims of sex trafficking. These laws provide immunity to the survivors and shifts the burden of proof away from the individual. In general, incentivizing survivor cooperation in the prosecution process can be helpful considering the emotional manipulation and perceived romantic attachment that often stop survivors from accusing their traffickers or seeking help. After TPVA's initial implementation, several agencies and task forces were created. The Act has also undergone multiple revisions and authorizations. In February 2000, the Department of Justice established a Trafficking in Persons and Worker Exploitation Task Force hotline that increased the number of trafficking cases that were opened and investigated. In 2001, the Office to Monitor and Combat Trafficking in Persons was established. In both 2001 and 2003, new criminal statues were added to TVPA to make it easier to prosecute traffickers. In 2003, TPVA was amended to provide access to civil remedies to trafficking cases to reduce a survivor's reliance on the criminal justice system. The Act was reauthorized in 2003, 2005, 2008, and 2013. The State Department publishes an annual Trafficking in Persons Report (TIP Reports), which examines the progress that the U.S. and other countries have made in destroying human trafficking businesses, arresting the traffickers, and supporting the victims.

On the state level, sex trafficking legislation varies in terms of definitions and approaches. California sex trafficking legislation offers legal protection for women so they can make choices outside the criminal justice system and pursue civil remedies. California legislation also offers case worker privileges in sex trafficking cases. In Connecticut, in addition to safe harbor laws for minor victims of sex trafficking, there is also an emphasis on educating employees in the hotel industry to identify sex trafficking. The logic is that since trafficking activities often happen in hotels, employees need to be able to identify and report these occurrences. There are also arguments that the hotel industry needs to be offered incentives to report sex trafficking since they benefit financially from having guests in their hotels. Another provision in Connecticut's sex trafficking legislation is increased punishment for purchasers of sex.

In July 2019, the Federal Bureau of Investigation (FBI) conducted a month-long operation to detect and detain sex traffickers and recover child victims. More than 100 sex trafficking victims were successfully rescued across the United States, under the initiative called "Operation Independence Day". Besides, a total of 67 suspected traffickers were arrested.

Towards the end of 2021, President Joe Biden signed an updated plan to fight against human trafficking. It is titled The National Action Plan to Combat Human Trafficking (NAP). The new version is targeted toward those in society that are most impacted by trafficking. This includes marginalized groups who disproportionately face social and economic inequalities and are thus more susceptible to being trafficked. It is a three-year plan that entails improved protection for victims, a stronger indictment of traffickers, and other preventative measures. The National Action Plan requires collaboration between all levels of government and agencies to effectively support anti-trafficking services and policies. It relies on trafficking survivors' advice on what preventative measures should be taken as well as what protections and resources need to be allocated to survivors. The plan aims to address the needs of marginalized communities by improving racial and gender disparities, improving workers' rights, and establishing safe migration.

Starting with President Obama, in 2010, every consecutive President has declared January to be the month to educate and raise awareness regarding human trafficking. January has become "National Human Trafficking Prevention Month". During this time, efforts and progress to prevent trafficking are celebrated. The U.S. Department of State is tasked with disseminating information regarding human trafficking internationally. This is to continue the conversation and emphasize the importance of anti-trafficking efforts around the globe. During January, individuals are taught how they can work together to identify, prevent, and respond to trafficking.

=== Council of Europe ===
Complementary protection is ensured through the Council of Europe Convention on the Protection of Children against Sexual Exploitation and Sexual Abuse (signed in Lanzarote, October 25, 2007). The Convention entered into force on July 1, 2010. As of November 2020, the convention has been ratified by 47 states, with Ireland having signed but not yet ratified. The goal of the convention is to provide the framework for an independent and effective monitoring system that holds the member states accountable for addressing human trafficking and providing protecting to victims. To monitor the implementation of this act, the Council of Europe established the Group of Experts on Action against Trafficking in Human Beings (GRETA). The Convention address the structure and purpose of GRETA and holds the group accountable to publish reports evaluating the measures taken by the states who have signed the convention.

=== Other government actions ===
Actions taken to combat human trafficking vary from government to government. Some government actions include:

- introducing legislation specifically aimed at criminalizing human trafficking;
- developing co-operation between law enforcement agencies and non-government organizations (NGOs) of numerous nations; and
- raising awareness of the issue.

Raising awareness can take three forms. First, governments can raise awareness among potential victims, particularly in countries where human traffickers are active. Second, they can raise awareness amongst the police, social welfare workers and immigration officers to equip them to deal appropriately with the problem. And finally, in countries where prostitution is legal or semi-legal, they can raise awareness amongst the clients of prostitution so that they can watch for signs of human trafficking victims. Methods to raise general awareness often include television programs, documentary films, internet communications, and posters.

=== Criticism of prevention and intervention efforts ===
Many countries have come under criticism for inaction, or ineffective action. Criticisms include the failure of governments to properly identify and protect trafficking victims, enactment of immigration policies which potentially re-victimize trafficking victims, including by deporting them, and insufficient action in helping prevent vulnerable populations from becoming trafficking victims. A particular criticism has been the reluctance of some countries to tackle trafficking for purposes other than sex.

Studies of sex work and anti-sex trafficking efforts, intended to combat sex trafficking or provide support to victims, have raised concerns over the unintended effects of certain national and international policies, law enforcement strategies, and activist efforts on both sex-trafficked individuals and non-trafficked sex workers. For example, The United States' Tier 2 assessment of Japan on its 2004 TIP Report encouraged the Japanese government to add additional constraints to its procedures and policies for obtaining an entertainer visa, sometimes used by migrant workers seeking employment at businesses within the sex industry. However, these regulations provided opportunities for some third-party facilitators of these visas to exploit migrants while also limiting migrants' ability to leave employers with poor working conditions or overly restrictive practices, such as holding their passports or limiting their ability to leave the premises of the business. Practices of law enforcement officers in some countries have also been criticized for incentivizing non-trafficked sex workers to declare themselves to be trafficking victims and enter aid and rehabilitation programs to avoid prison sentences for prostitution charges.

=== Non-governmental organizations ===
Many non-governmental organizations (NGOs) work on the issue of sex trafficking. One major NGO is the International Justice Mission (IJM). IJM is a U.S.-based non-profit human rights organization that combats human trafficking in developing countries in Latin America, Asia, and Africa. IJM states that it is a "human rights agency that brings rescue to victims of slavery, sexual exploitation, and other forms of violent oppression". It is a faith-based organization since its purported goal is to "restore to victims of oppression the things that God intends for them: their lives, their liberty, their dignity, the fruits of their labor". The IJM receives over $900,000 from the U.S. government. The organization has two methods for rescuing victims: brothel raids in cooperation with local police, and "buy bust" operations in which undercover agencies pretend to purchase sex services from an underage girl. After the raid and rescue, the women are sent to rehabilitation programs run by NGOs (such as churches) or the government.

There are also survivor-led organizations that provide services to victims of exploitation and trafficking including Treasures, founded by Harmony (Dust) Grillo in 2003 and GEMS founded by Rachel Lloyd in 1998.

There are also national non-governmental organizations working on the issue of human trafficking, including sex trafficking. In Kenya, for example, Awareness Against Human Trafficking (HAART) works on ending all human trafficking in the country. HAART has also participated in the UNANIMA International Stop the Demand campaign.

In India, J. Walter Thompson Amsterdam has opened a school called School for Justice. Here, survivors of sex trafficking are educated to become lawyers. The entire program is expected to take five to six years for each girl to complete. The women will graduate with law degrees, with a special focus on commercial sexual exploitation cases. JWT hopes that one day they may become prosecutors, or even judges, empowered to combat the criminals who once exploited and abused them.

NGOs often have the best of intentions when combating sex-trafficking. NGOs are often funded by the West and are implemented in countries that have a very different culture. Research shows that employees of the Western NGOs are slow to adapt to the culture of the community they are providing services to. This often leads to a disconnect between the NGO and the community. Employees of NGOs hold the responsibility of relaying the narrative of sex-trafficked people. This can create a hierarchical structure that makes the voice of Western NGOs as more legitimate than the voice of the people they are serving. Thus, reinforcing the essentialized notion of third-world women as backwards and other.

Japan is a popular place for sex-trafficking. Japan has a long history with the trade of women for sex. For a good part of the country's history, sex work was legal in Japan. This makes it difficult for the government to decipher between legal sex work and illegal prostitution. This is where NGOs step in to assist the government. NGOs provide services in countries where the government policies are failing to combat a specific issue. However, in Japan it is difficult for NGOs focused on issues with women to receive local funding. This weak political support makes the work for NGOs in Japan much more difficult. Japan's lack of support for women's rights shows why the role of NGOs is so important in that country.

=== Campaigns and initiatives ===
Public information campaigns are defined as a "government-directed and sponsored effort to communicate to the public or a segment of the public in order to achieve a policy result".

In the past ten years, Spain has seen a surge of sex trafficking. In light of this crisis, social movements, organizations and government institutions have enacted policies like the Second National Plan against Sex Trafficking and Anti-Trafficking laws. Campaigns to fight against sex trafficking in Spain between 2008 and 2017 have been examined by researchers. Their research showed that many campaigns focus on the narrative of the victim as vulnerable and weak, rather than focusing on the actual crime of sex trafficking and the economic system that allows it to flourish. According to the research these narratives disempower sex trafficked people through repeated language of vulnerability and innocence. The researchers explain that the lack of information provided in these campaigns hinders their success. Campaigns will throw out huge numbers of women exploited into sex work but gives no context to the system that allows sex trafficking to flourish.

In 1994, Global Alliance Against Traffic in Women was established to combat trafficking in women on any grounds. It is an alliance of more than 100 non-governmental organizations from Africa, Asia, Europe, Latin America, the Caribbean and North America. The popular TV channel MTV started a campaign to combat sex trafficking. The initiative called MTV EXIT (End Exploitation and Trafficking) is a multimedia initiative produced by MTV EXIT Foundation (formerly known as the MTV Europe Foundation) to raise awareness and increase prevention of human trafficking.

Another campaign is the A21 Campaign, Abolishing Injustice in the 21st Century, which focuses on addressing human trafficking through a holistic approach. They provide potential victims with the education and valuable information on how to best reduce their likelihood of being trafficked through strategies that reduce their vulnerability. The organization also provides safe environments for victims and runs restoration programs in their aftercare facilities. In addition, they provide legal council and representation to victims so they can prosecute their traffickers. Another key component of the campaign is to help influence legislation to enact more comprehensive laws that place more traffickers in prison. The vast majority of victims who received assistance were from the Netherlands and the number of victims served increased by 42 percent from 2012. The campaign allocates the majority of their funds to providing victims health and nutritional care and education. Not for Sale provides a safe shelter for victims and empowers them with life skills and job training. This helps trafficked individuals re-enter into the workforce through a dignified form of work. In the organization's 2013 Annual Impact Report, it was determined that 75 percent of the victims had been sexually exploited.

While globalization fostered new technologies that may exacerbate sex trafficking, technology can also be used to assist law enforcement and anti-trafficking efforts. A study was done on online classified ads surrounding the Super Bowl. A number of reports have noticed increase in sex trafficking during previous years of the Super Bowl. For the 2011 Super Bowl held in Dallas, Texas, the Backpage website for the Dallas area experienced a 136 percent increase on the number of posts in the Adult section that Sunday. Typically, Sundays were known to be the day of the week with the lowest number of posts in the Adult section. Researchers analyzed the most salient terms in these online ads and found that most commonly used words suggested that many escorts were traveling across state lines to Dallas specifically for the Super Bowl. Also, the self-reported ages were higher than usual which conveys that an older population of sex trafficking victims were drawn to the event, but since these are self-reported the data is not reliable. Despite a lot of media hype about a supposed spike in sex trafficking surrounding the Super Bowl, academics and anti-trafficking campaigners have said this is largely a myth. They say that while the commercial sex market does grow modestly during large events, sex trafficking is a year-round problem. Twitter was another social networking platform studied for detecting sex trafficking. Digital tools can be used to narrow the pool of sex trafficking cases, albeit imperfectly and with uncertainty.

==== Celebrity campaigns: #RealMenDontBuyGirls ====
Scholars have examined how high-profile anti-trafficking campaigns circulated through Western media reinforce gendered narratives about trafficking, emphasizing a "girl versus pimp" dichotomy. The "Real Men Don't Buy Girls" campaign—launched by Demi Moore and Ashton Kutcher and amplified through Western popular culture—has received criticism since its release in 2010.

Intersectional scholars argue that the initiative portrays trafficking primarily as the exploitation of young girls by predatory men, focusing on individual "bad actors" while overlooking the social and economic systems—poverty, labor market exploration, immigration barriers, and gender inequality—that shape susceptibility to exploitation. Critics also note that the campaign's language undermines survivor autonomy and reinforces narrow assumptions about victimhood: the phrase "real men" ties morality to masculinity, and the focus on victims as "girls" reinforces a gendered and infantilizing narrative, thereby marginalizing adult, male, transgender, and gender non-conforming victims.

Through celebrity amplification and social media, the campaign shapes public perception of trafficking, influencing who is recognized as a victim and who receives attention or aid. By circulating globally, #RealMenDontBuyGirls reproduces Western-centric "rescue" narratives that reduce complex forms of exploitation to simplified stories of villains, victims, and saviors. These narratives often ignore local perspectives and analyses in countries where trafficking occurs, including voluntary sex work and locally informed assessments of safety, profitability, and exploitation.

==== "End Demand" ====
The term "End Demand" refers to anti-sex trafficking strategies that focus on the johns, the sex buyers. A common strategy is to make it a crime to buy sex, whether consensual or not. End Demand is very popular in some countries, including the United States and Canada. In the 1990s, for example, specific media attention was paid to sex trafficking of women outside the United States. The feminist reaction to this at the time was to not just call for social services for trafficked people but also for harsher punishments for johns. Proponents of the End Demand strategy support initiatives such as john schools to "rehabilitate" the johns, increased arrests of johns, and public shaming (e.g. billboards and websites that publicly name johns who were caught). John schools were pioneered in San Francisco in 1995 and now used in many cities across the U.S. as well as other countries such as the UK and Canada. Some compare john schools programs to driver's safety courses, because first offenders can pay a fee to attend class(es) on the harms of prostitution, and upon completion, the charges against the john will be dropped. Another initiative in line with the End Demand strategy is the cross-country tour "Ignite the Road to Justice", launched by the 2011 Miss Canada, Tara Teng. Teng's initiative circulates a petition to end the demand for commercial sex that drives prostitution and sex trafficking. End Demand efforts also include large-scale public awareness campaigns. Campaigns were started in Sweden, Massachusetts, Rhode Island, and Atlanta, Georgia. Massachusetts and Rhode Island also had legislative efforts that criminalized prostitution and increased end demand efforts by targeting johns.

The Atlanta campaign ran from 2006 to 2008 and was titled "Dear John". It ran ads in local media reaching out to potential johns to discourage them from buying sex. The ads mimicked a break-up letter to John. Critics of the Dear John campaign focus on the 'male demand' aspect of the campaign and find that this style of campaign reinforces gendered, racialized and sexualized assumptions about johns and trafficked women. The historical discourse in the U.S. concerning johns is racially charged. An example of this racialized nature is associated with the temptations of Thai massage parlors. Despite these objections, lawmakers have found this messaging morally compelling. The campaign was run by locals of Atlanta. Advocates for the campaign informed citizens through media that young women were the ones being arrested while the johns were not. Contextual analysis research has shown the essentialized nature of the campaign. The Dear John campaign posters define women in terms of their relationship to sex. They also only depict white girls in the images inferring that the only victims worth caring about are young white and innocent.

There are no images of johns in the campaign posters. A plausible explanation for this would be an effort by the campaign to widen the scope of the messaging and to avoid racial stereotypes. Conversely, the racial stereotypes of trafficked girls is made clear. This excludes a majority of victims who do not identify with the image that the poster conveys. Lawmakers in Atlanta were fully behind the campaign as a statement to the public that they will not tolerate the purchasing of sex. These public statements are in stark contrast to the actual amount of funding that the city gave to organizations who provide housing and services for victims. The city did no research into the effectiveness of the campaign and therefore there is no data on its actual impact on the city. It is also important to note that the campaign ads were only in English and many people are not familiar with the Dear John reference. Lawmakers believe that the campaign was effective in bringing awareness to the issue and therefore shaped public opinion and policy.

=== Recognition of males in the global fight against trafficking ===
The lack of conversation, advocacy, legal/social support services, and academic work around the sexual exploitation of men and boys can be traced to larger social discourses surrounding male sexuality, dominance, and behavior. Media representations of masculinity and sexual dominance contribute to the idea that men cannot be victims, especially in regards to sex-related crimes. The lack of public knowledge and attention to male victimhood and vulnerability is strongly reflected in the quality of services and strength of legal frameworks available to male victims of sex trafficking . Experts describe the "perceived agency and resilience in young males" to be a strong force in deterring male victims from seeking the support they need, and discouraging male-inclusive anti-trafficking service and support networks from forming in the first place. Within the spare support frameworks for male victims that do exist, the specific vulnerabilities of different populations in different areas around the world—regarding nationality and migration status, sexual orientation, drug use, socio-economic status, health status, family structure, and more—are often unaddressed, leaving crucial groups' needs unmet. The double stigma that surrounds male victims of sex trafficking, involving homosexuality and sex work more broadly—makes it incredibly difficult for male victims to come forward and seek help, or even to self-organize. Some scholars report that male victims have also faced higher rates of police violence and brutality than female victims in regards to contact with law enforcement.

=== Criminalizing and legalizing prostitution ===
Laws regarding the purchase and sale of voluntary and involuntary sex vary greatly across the developed world. Their effects on sex trafficking are difficult to discern. In the U.S., people who immigrate to the U.S. and have a role in sex trade, are criminalized on the bases of if they are voluntarily or involuntarily brought to the U.S. or come to the U.S. through sex trafficking or consensual sex work/prostitution. One tactic used to identify an individual's role within sex trade is the presence of consent within the situation or context, which is used to determine if someone is a victim of sex trafficking or a prostitute. Holes do exist within this framework because the ability to identify consent is not always simple in every case. Additionally the influence of the criminalization of sex work within a country influences the way people who have a role within slave trade are handled. Those who immigrate to the U.S. for sex work, if identified as a prostitute instead of a victim of sex trafficking, can have their ability to receive legal aid or future citizenship impaired.

Proponents of various forms of criminalization, legalization, or regulation of prostitution, may all argue their model decreases sex trafficking. The Dutch model of legalization and regulation and the Swedish model of criminalizing purchasers and pimps but not prostitutes are often discussed. The difference of these models casts the prevention of trafficking against the rights of voluntary sex workers and purchasers. It is argued that a hybrid model of licensing sex workers and criminalizing the purchase of unlicensed sex would reduce trafficking without crushing civil rights.

=== 2017 Giving Day ===
Numerous international organizations have partnered to create an anti-human trafficking Giving Day to raise awareness and funds on July 30, 2017. This is the day designated by the United Nations as the World Day against Trafficking in Persons. The Giving Day is being hosted by Charidy.com, a crowdfunding platform for non-profits.

The General Assembly in 2010, adopted the Global Plan of Action to Combat Trafficking in Persons, encouraging Governments around the world to undergo drastic measures in order defeat human trafficking. The goal was to put the fight against human trafficking into the United Nations' programmes to strengthen positive development and security around the world. A main section of the plan is to place a United Nations Trust Fund for the women and children who fell victim of trafficking. The Trust Fund in the plan ensures to assist and protect the victims of trafficking through grants to certified NGOs. In the future, the goal is to make the victims a priority who are come were victims and had issues with migration. It also places a focus on the aid to victims who were trafficked by their perpetrator for the goal of sexual relations, organ removal, forced begging, forced criminality, and emerging exploitative reasons.

The General Assembly in the year 2013, gathered a meeting to go over the world's plan of action. Numerous states also declared July 30 as the World Day against Trafficking in Persons. They came to the conclusion that day of remembrance and awareness was crucial to remember the victims, the right's they possess and their protection.

=== "Buying Sex Is A Crime" ===
"Buying Sex Is A Crime" is a slogan used by anti human trafficking and abolitionist groups. The first known public use of the slogan was by thetraffickedhuman.org. in 2016 on a billboard campaign in metro Vancouver, British Columbia. thetraffickedhuman.org is a coalition that works to end the exploitation of women, youth, and girls.

The slogan with the same billboard artwork was also used by buyingsexisacrime.ca in 2017 throughout Canada including Edmonton, Alberta. The slogan was also picked up by the Edmonton Police's own awareness initiative. In 2018, a new campaign was launched at buyingsexisacrime.org sponsored by the Vancouver Collective Against Sexual Exploitation. The collective is a Vancouver, British Columbia, based abolitionist group of lawyers, judges, social workers, professionals, teachers, activists and advocates working to end sexual exploitation.

== See also ==
- Child laundering
- Exploitation of labour
- Forced prostitution
- Karayuki-san
- Migrant sex work
- People smuggling
- Protocol to Prevent, Suppress and Punish Trafficking in Persons, Especially Women and Children
- Sex tourism
- Trafficking of children
- Transnational efforts to prevent human trafficking
