= International Agreement for the suppression of the White Slave Traffic =

1904 multilateral treaty

The International Agreement for the suppression of the White Slave Traffic (also known as the White Slave convention) is a series of anti–human trafficking treaties, specifically aimed at the illegal trade of white people, the first of which was first negotiated in Paris in 1904. It was one of the first multilateral treaties to address issues of slavery and human trafficking. The convention held that human trafficking was a punishable crime and that the 12 signatories should exchange information regarding human trafficking operations.

The Slavery, Servitude, Forced Labour and Similar Institutions and Practices Convention of 1926 and the International Convention for the Suppression of the Traffic in Women and Children of 1933 are similar documents.

== Background ==
In Anglophone countries in the 19th and early 20th centuries, the phrase "white slavery" was used to refer to sexual enslavement of white women. It was particularly associated with accounts of women enslaved in Middle Eastern harems, such as the so-called Circassian beauties, which was a slave trade that was still ongoing in the early 20th century. Many of the procurers and prostitutes who had accompanied the British and French troops to Constantinople during the Crimean War in the 1850s opened brothels in Port Said in Egypt during the construction of the Suez Canal, and these brothels was a destination for many victims of the white slave trade, since they were under protection of the foreign consulates because of the Capitulatory privileges until 1937 and therefore protected from the police.

An international campaign against the white slave trade started in several countries in the West in the late 19th-century. In 1877 the first international congress for the abolition of prostitution took place in Geneva in Switzerland, followed by the foundation of the International Association of Friends of Young Girls (German: Internationale Verein Freundinnen junger Mädchen or FJM; French: Amies de la jeune fille); after this, national associations to combat the white slave trade was gradually founded in a number of nations, such as the Freundinnenverein in Germany, the National Vigilance Association in Britain and Vaksamhet in Sweden. Moral panic over the "traffic in women" rose to a peak in England in the 1880s, after the exposure of the Eliza Armstrong case and the internationally infamous White slave trade affair in the 1880s.

In 1899 the first international congress against white slave trade took place in London, where the International Bureau for the Suppression of the Traffic in Women and Children was founded to coordinate an international campaign, and as a result of the campaign of the movement suggestions was put forward on how to combat the white slave trade in Paris in 1902, which eventually resulted in the International Agreement for the suppression of the White Slave Traffic in May 1904.

== Early treaties ==
The initial treaty was concluded in Paris on 18 May 1904 and came into force on 18 July 1905. A total of 26 states ratified the original 1904 treaty. However, five years after the treaty came into force, it was re-negotiated in Paris and concluded on 4 May 1910. The 1910 treaty came into force on 5 July 1920, and a total of 41 states ratified it.

== 1949 Protocol ==
In 1949 in Lake Success, New York, a Protocol was negotiated which amended and updated both the 1904 and the 1910 treaties. The Protocol was concluded on 4 May 1949 and came into force on the same date. The resulting amended treaties came into force on 21 June 1951 (1904 version) and 14 August 1951 (1910 version). As of 2013, 33 states have ratified the amending Protocol and the amended 1949 versions of the treaties have 54 state parties.

== See also ==
- Child grooming
- Sexual slavery
