= White slavery =

Enslavement of people of European descent

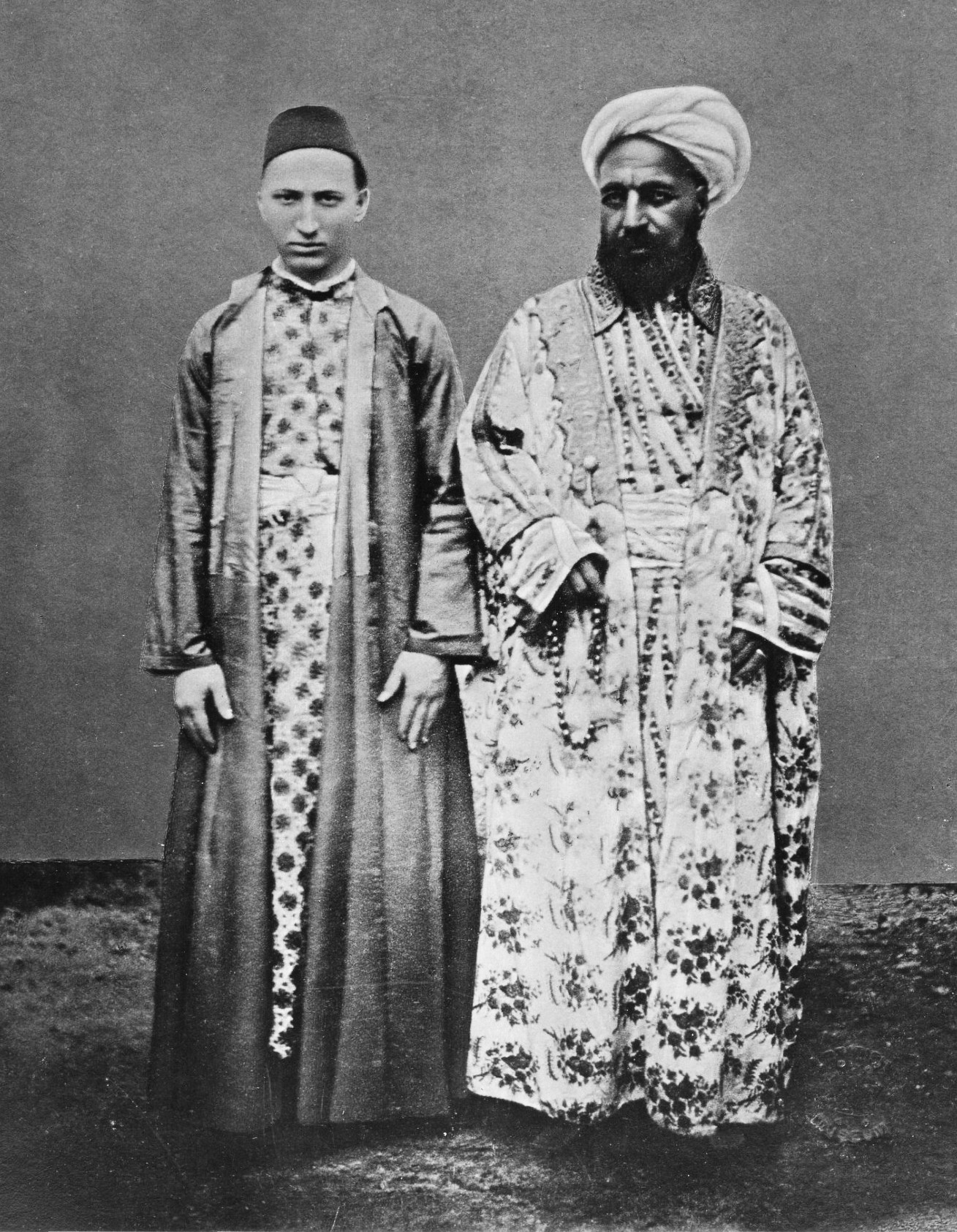
An Arab merchant from Mecca (right) and his Circassian slave. Entitled, "Vornehmer Kaufmann mit seinem Cirkassischen Sklaven" [Distinguished merchant and his Circassian slave] by Christiaan Snouck Hurgronje, c. 1888.

White slavery (also white slave trade or white slave trafficking) refers to the enslavement of any of the world's European ethnic groups throughout human history, whether perpetrated by non-Europeans or by other Europeans. Slavery in ancient Rome was frequently dependent on a person's socio-economic status and national affiliation, and thus included European slaves. It was also common for European people to be enslaved and traded in the Muslim world; European women, in particular, were highly sought-after to be concubines in the harems of many Muslim rulers. Examples of such slavery conducted in Islamic empires include the Trans-Saharan slave trade, the Barbary slave trade, the Ottoman slave trade, and the Black Sea slave trade, among others.

During the Arab slave trade, Europeans were among those traded by the Arabs. The term Saqaliba (Arabic: صقالبة) was often used in medieval Arabic sources to refer specifically to Slavs being traded by the Arabs, but it could also refer more broadly to Central, Southern, and Eastern Europeans who were also traded by the Arabs, as well as all European slaves in some Muslim-controlled regions like Spain, including those abducted from raids on Spanish Christian kingdoms. During the era of the Fatimid Caliphate (909–1171), the majority of slaves were Europeans taken from European coasts and during conflicts. Similarly, the Ottoman slave trade that included European captives was often fueled by raids into European territories or were taken as children in the form of a blood tax from the families of citizens of conquered territories to serve the empire for a variety of functions. In the mid-19th century, the term 'white slavery' was used to describe the Christian slaves that were sold into the Barbary slave trade in North Africa.

In the late 19th-century, the term "white slave trade" became associated with sex trafficking of primarily women and girls for sexual exploitation. This term was in use also for the first half of the 20th century, when it was gradually replaced with the more modern term trafficking.

== History ==
The phrase "white slavery" was used by Charles Sumner in 1847 to describe the slavery of Christians throughout the Barbary States and primarily in Algiers, the capital of Ottoman Algeria. It also encompassed many forms of slavery, including the European concubines (Cariye) often found in Turkish harem. In the Muslim world, sexual slavery was legitimate by Islamic law in the form of concubinage in Islam, and there was an ongoing traffick in slave girls for the purpose of sexual exploitation to the harems.

The term was also used by Clifford G. Roe from the beginning of the twentieth century to campaign against the forced prostitution and sexual slavery of girls who worked in Chicago brothels. Similarly, countries of Europe campaigned against the sex trafficking of women and girls in both Europe as well as brothels in Asia from the late 19th century. European countries signed in Paris in 1904 an International Agreement for the suppression of the White Slave Traffic aimed at combating the sale of women who were forced into prostitution in the countries of continental Europe as well as Asia.

The use of the term "white slavery" in this sense was considered racist and replaced by "traffic" by The League of Nations in 1921.

== White slave trade ==
=== Slavic slaves ===
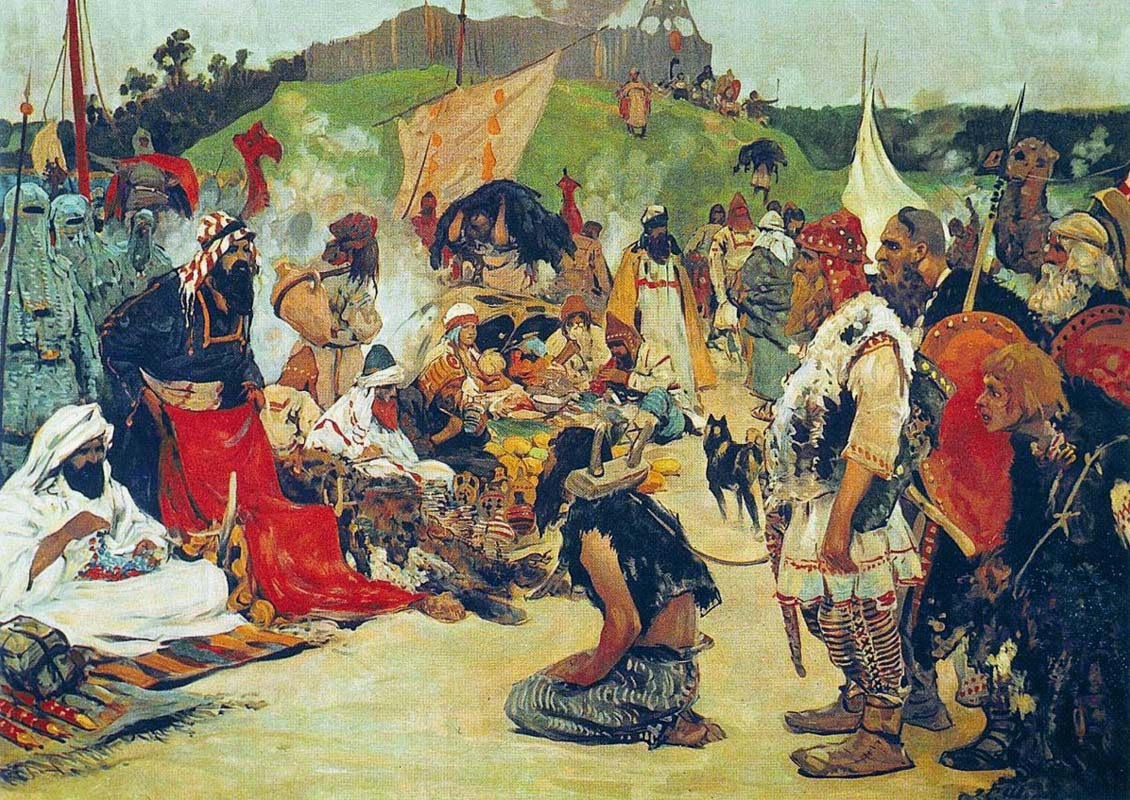
The Rus trading slaves with the Khazars: Trade in the East Slavic Camp by Sergei Ivanov (1913)

The Volga trade route was established by the Varangians (Vikings) who settled in Northwestern Russia in the early 9th century. About 10 km (6 mi) south of the Volkhov River entry into Lake Ladoga, they established a settlement called Ladoga (Old Norse: Aldeigjuborg). It connected Northern Europe and Northwestern Russia with the Caspian Sea, via the Volga River. The Rus used this route to trade with Muslim countries on the southern shores of the Caspian Sea, sometimes penetrating as far as Baghdad. The route functioned concurrently with the Dnieper trade route, better known as the trade route from the Varangians to the Greeks, and lost its importance in the 11th century.

Saqaliba originally was used to denote Slavic people, however later it came to denote all European slaves in some Muslim regions like Spain including those abducted from raids on Christian kingdoms of Spain. The Franks started buying slaves from the Slavs and Avar Khaganate while Muslims also came across slaves in the form of mercenaries serving the Byzantine Empire and settlers in addition to among the Khazars. Most Slavic slaves were imported to the Muslim world through the border between Christian and Islamic kingdoms where castration centres were also located instead of the direct route. From there they were sent into Islamic Spain and other Muslim-ruled regions especially North Africa. The saqaliba gained popularity in Umayyad Spain especially as warriors. After the collapse of the Umayyads, they also came to rule over many of the taifas. With the conversion of Eastern Europe, the trade declined and there isn't much textual information on saqaliba after 11th century.

Central Europe was the most favoured destination for importation of slaves alongside Central Asia and Bilad as-Sudan, though slaves from Northwestern Europe were also valued. This slave trade was controlled mostly by European slave traders. France and Venice were the routes used to send Slavic slaves to Muslim lands and Prague served as a major centre for castration of Slavic captives. The Emirate of Bari also served as an important port for this trade. Due to the Byzantine Empire and Venice blocking Arab merchants from European ports, they later started importing in slaves from the Caucasus and the Caspian Sea.

The Saqaliba were also imported as eunuchs and concubines to Muslim states. The slavery of eunuchs in the Muslim world however was expensive and they thus were given as gifts by rulers. The Saqaliba eunuchs were prominent at the court of Aghlabids and later Fatimids who imported them from Spain. The Fatimids also used other Saqaliba slaves for military purposes.

=== Crimean Khanate ===
In the time of the Crimean Khanate, Crimeans engaged in frequent raids into the Danubian principalities, Poland–Lithuania, and Muscovy. For each captive, the khan received a fixed share (savğa) of 10 percent or 20 percent. The campaigns by Crimean forces categorize into sefers, declared military operations led by the khans themselves, and çapuls, raids undertaken by groups of noblemen, sometimes illegally because they contravened treaties concluded by the khans with neighbouring rulers. For a long time, until the early 18th century, the khanate maintained a massive slave trade with the Ottoman Empire and the Middle East. Caffa was one of the best known and significant trading ports and slave markets. Crimean Tatar raiders enslaved between 1 and 2 million slaves from Russia and Poland–Lithuania over the period 1500–1700. Caffa (city on Crimean peninsula) was one of the best known and significant trading ports and slave markets. In 1769, a last major Tatar raid resulted in the capture of 20,000 Russian and Ruthenian slaves.

=== Barbary slave trade ===
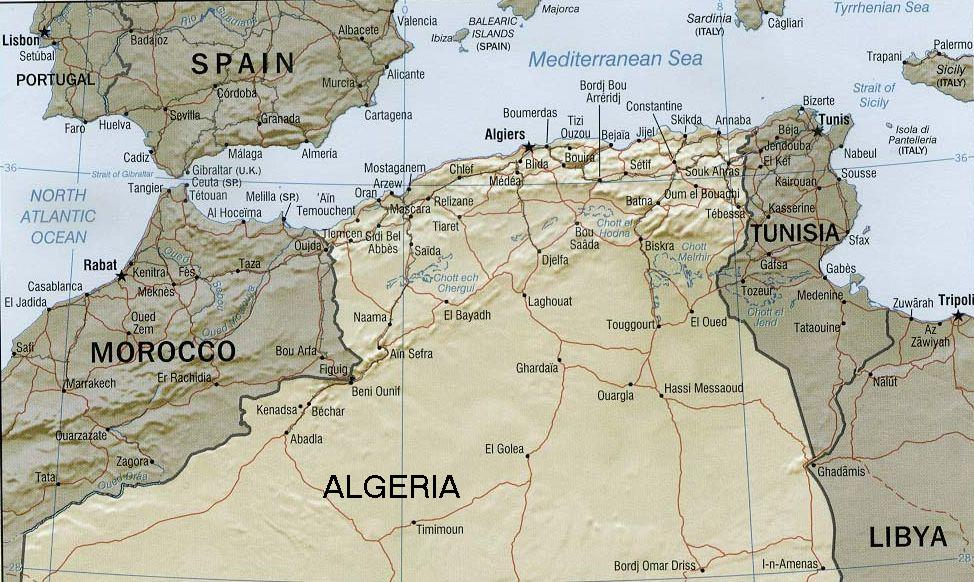
The Barbary Coast

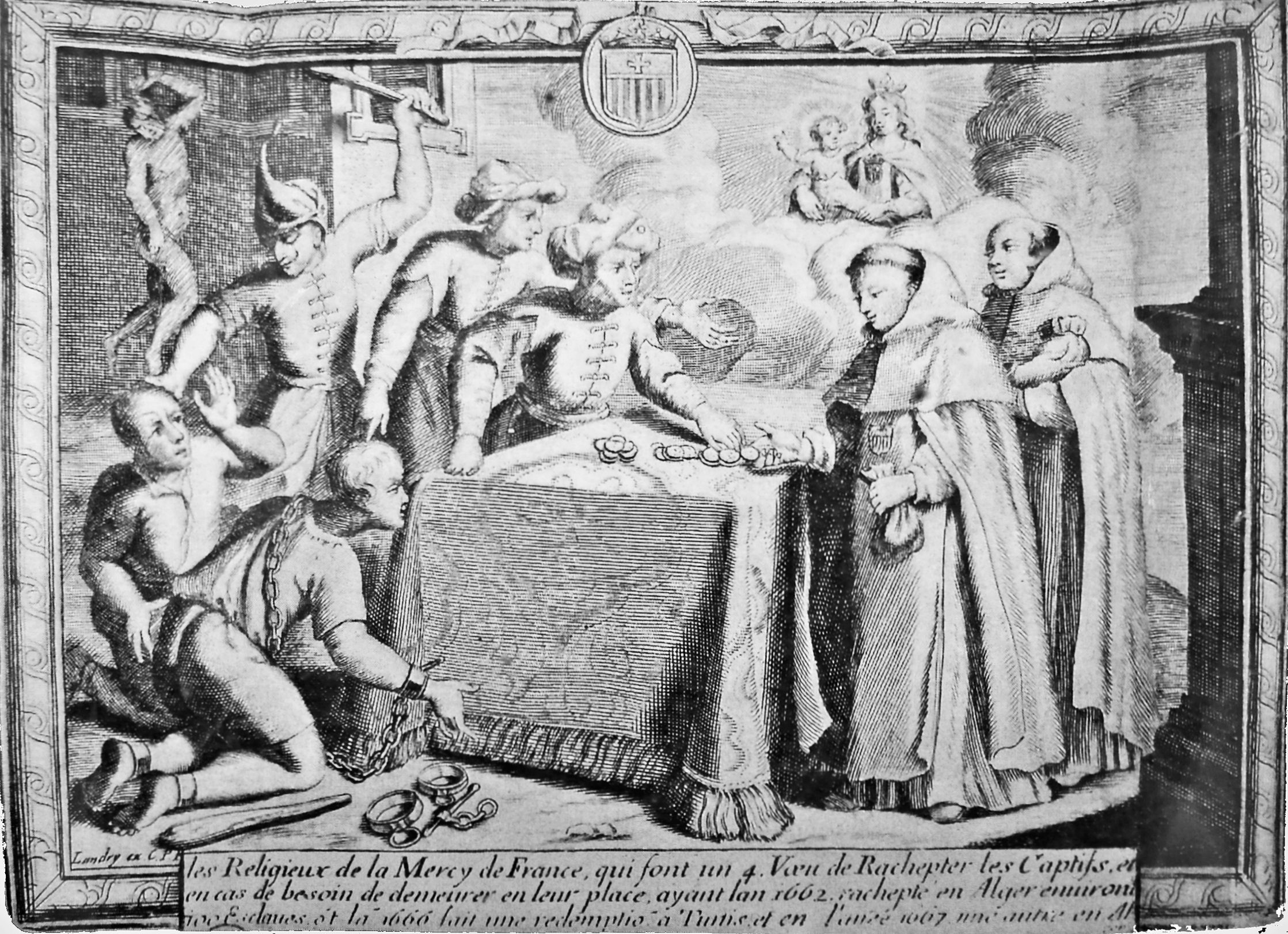
The purchase of Christian captives by Catholic monks in the Barbary states

Slave markets flourished on the Barbary Coast of North Africa, in what is modern-day Morocco, Algeria, Tunisia, and western Libya, between the 15th and middle of the 19th century.

These markets prospered while the states were nominally under Ottoman suzerainty, though, in reality, they were mostly autonomous. The North African slave markets traded in European slaves which were acquired by Barbary pirates in slave raids on ships and by raids on coastal towns from Italy to Spain, Portugal, France, England, the Netherlands, and as far afield as the Turkish Abductions in Iceland. Men, women, and children were captured to such a devastating extent that vast numbers of sea coast towns were abandoned.

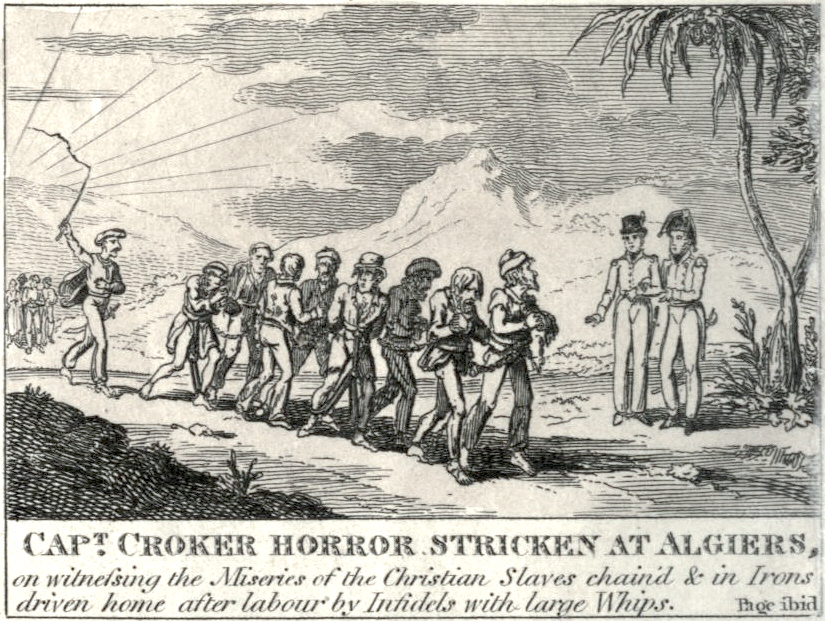
1815 illustration of a group of Christian slaves in Algiers by British artist Walter Croker

According to Robert Davis, between 1 million and 1.25 million Europeans were captured by Barbary pirates and sold as slaves in North Africa and Ottoman Empire between the 15th and 19th centuries. However, to extrapolate his numbers, Davis assumes the number of European slaves captured by Barbary pirates was constant for a 250-year period, stating:

There are no records of how many men, women and children were enslaved, but it is possible to calculate roughly the number of fresh captives that would have been needed to keep populations steady and replace those slaves who died, escaped, were ransomed, or converted to Islam. On this basis it is thought that around 8,500 new slaves were needed annually to replenish numbers – about 850,000 captives over the century from 1580 to 1680. By extension, for the 250 years between 1530 and 1780, the figure could easily have been as high as 1,250,000."

Davis's numbers have been challenged by other historians, such as David Earle, who cautions that the true picture of European slaves is clouded by the fact the corsairs also seized non-Christian whites from eastern Europe and black people from west Africa. A second book by Davis, Holy War and Human Bondage: Tales of Christian–Muslim Slavery in the Early-Modern Mediterranean, widened its focus to related slavery. Middle East expert John Wright cautions that modern estimates are based on back-calculations from human observation.

Such observations, across the late 1500s and early 1600s observers, account for around 35,000 European Christian slaves held throughout this period on the Barbary Coast, across Tripoli and Tunis, but mostly in Algiers. The majority were sailors (particularly those who were English), taken with their ships, but others were fishermen and coastal villagers. However, most of these captives were people from lands close to Africa, particularly Spain and Italy.

From bases on the Barbary Coast of North Africa, the Barbary pirates raided ships traveling through the Mediterranean and along the northern and western coasts of Africa, plundering their cargo and enslaving the people they captured. From at least 1500, the pirates also conducted raids along seaside towns of Italy, Spain, France, England, the Netherlands and as far away as Iceland, capturing men, women and children. On some occasions, settlements such as Baltimore, Ireland, were abandoned following the raid, only being resettled many years later. Between 1609 and 1616, England alone had 466 merchant ships lost to Barbary pirates.

While Barbary corsairs looted the cargo of ships they captured, their primary goal was to capture people for sale as slaves or for ransom. Those who had family or friends who might ransom them were held captive, but not obliged to work; the most famous of these was the author Miguel de Cervantes, who was held for almost five years. Others were sold into various types of servitude. Attractive women or boys could be used as sex slaves. Captives who converted to Islam were generally freed, since enslavement of Muslims was prohibited; but this meant that they could never return to their native countries. Moroccan Sultan Moulay Ismail Ben Sharif controlled a fleet of corsairs based at Salé-le-Vieux and Salé-le-Neuf (now Rabat), which supplied him with Christian slaves and weapons through their raids in the Mediterranean and all the way to the Black Sea. Moulay Ismail was nicknamed the 'bloody king' by the Europeans due to his extreme cruelty and exaction of summary justice upon his Christian slaves. He is also known in his native country as the "Warrior King".

16th- and 17th-century customs statistics suggest that Istanbul's additional slave import from the Black Sea may have totaled around 2.5 million from 1450 to 1700. The markets declined after the loss of the Barbary Wars and ended in the 1830s, when the region was conquered by France.

=== Christian slavery in Muslim Iberia ===
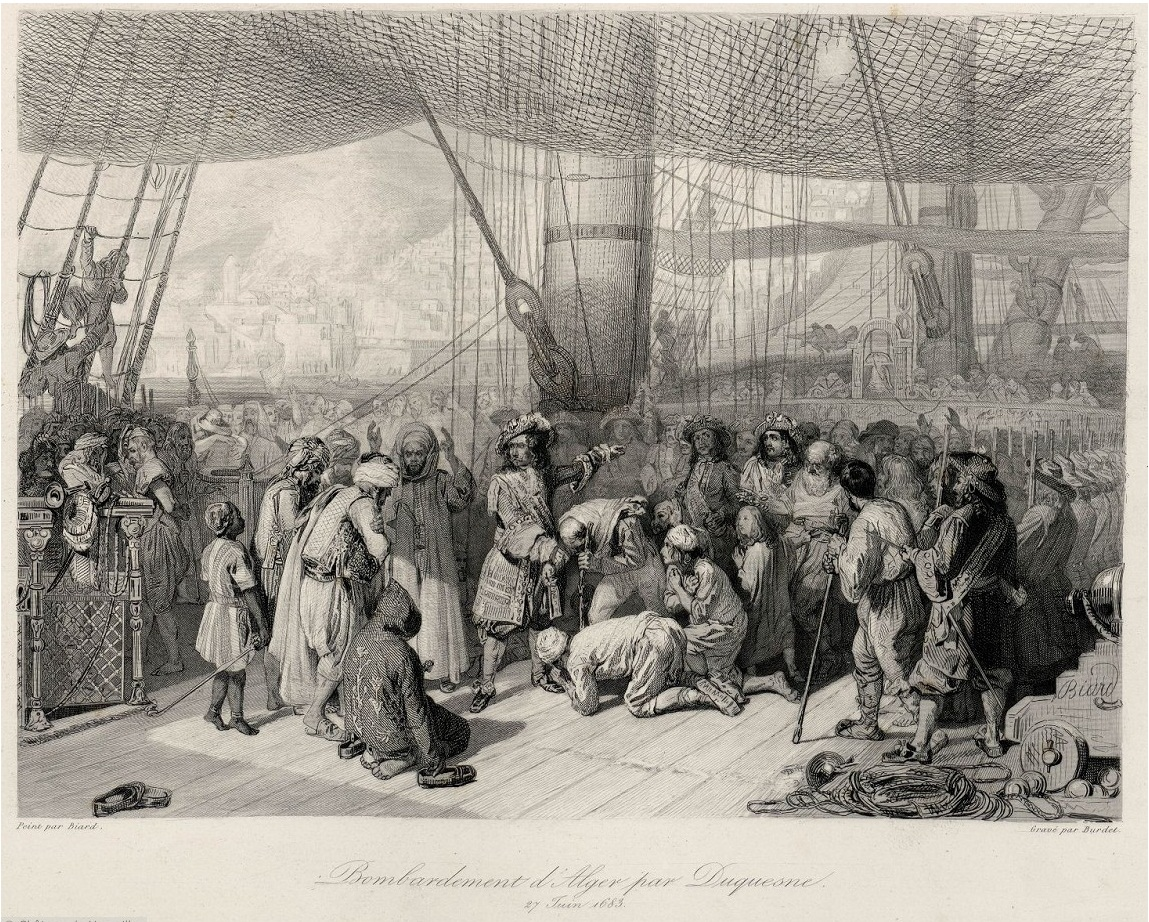
Abraham Duquesne delivering Christian captives in Algiers after the Bombardment of Algiers (1683)

During the al-Andalus (also known as Islamic Iberia), the Moors controlled much of the peninsula.

Muslim Spain imported Christian slaves from the 8th century until the Reconquista in the late 15th century. The slaves were exported from the Christian region of Spain, as well as from Eastern Europe, sparking significant reaction from many in Christian Spain and many Christians still living in Muslim Spain. Soon after, Muslims were successful, taking 30,000 Christian captives from Spain. In the eighth century, slavery lasted longer due to "frequent cross-border skirmishes, interspersed between periods of major campaigns". By the tenth century, in the eastern Mediterranean Byzantine, Christians were captured by Muslims. Many of the raids designed by Muslims were created for a fast capture of prisoners. Therefore, Muslims restricted the control in order to keep captives from fleeing. The Iberian peninsula served as a base for further exports of slaves into other Muslim regions in Northern Africa.

=== Ottoman slave trade ===
Slavery was a legal and a significant part of the Ottoman Empire's economy and society. The main sources of white slaves were Ottoman wars into Europe and organized enslavement expeditions in Eastern Europe, Southern Europe, the Balkans, Circassia and Georgia in the Caucasus. It has been reported that the selling price of slaves fell after large military operations. Enslavement of Europeans was banned in the early 19th century, while enslavement of other groups was permitted.

Even after several measures to ban slavery in the late 19th century, the practice continued largely unabated into the early 20th century. As late as 1908, female slaves were still sold in the Ottoman Empire. Sexual slavery was a central part of the Ottoman slave system throughout the history of the institution.

Nafisa al-Bayda, meaning "Nafisa the White-skinned", was a Circassian or Georgian woman who was enslaved and became the "most famous Mamluk woman in 18th-century Egypt", being a wife of Mamluk leaders of Egypt Ali Bey al-Kabir and Murad Bey.

=== Spanish slaves in Araucanía ===
In the Arauco War (1550–1662), a long-running conflict between Spanish and Mapuches in Chile, both sides engaged in slavery of the enemy population, among other atrocities. Much like the Spanish had captured Mapuche people, the Mapuches had also captured Spaniards, often women, and traded their ownership among them. Indeed, with the Destruction of the Seven Cities (1599–1604) Mapuches are reported to have taken 500 Spanish women captive, holding them as slaves. It was not uncommon for captive Spanish women to have changed owner several times. As late as in the 1850s alleged shipwreck survivor Elisa Bravo was said to be living as wife to a Mapuche cacique, in what is described as the most brutal forced coexistence resulting in children of "mixed blood". A report dating from 1863 said that her captors, fearing vengeance from Spaniards, sold her to the warlord Calfucurá in Puelmapu for a hundred mares, but that she had died after three years.

== European slavery ==
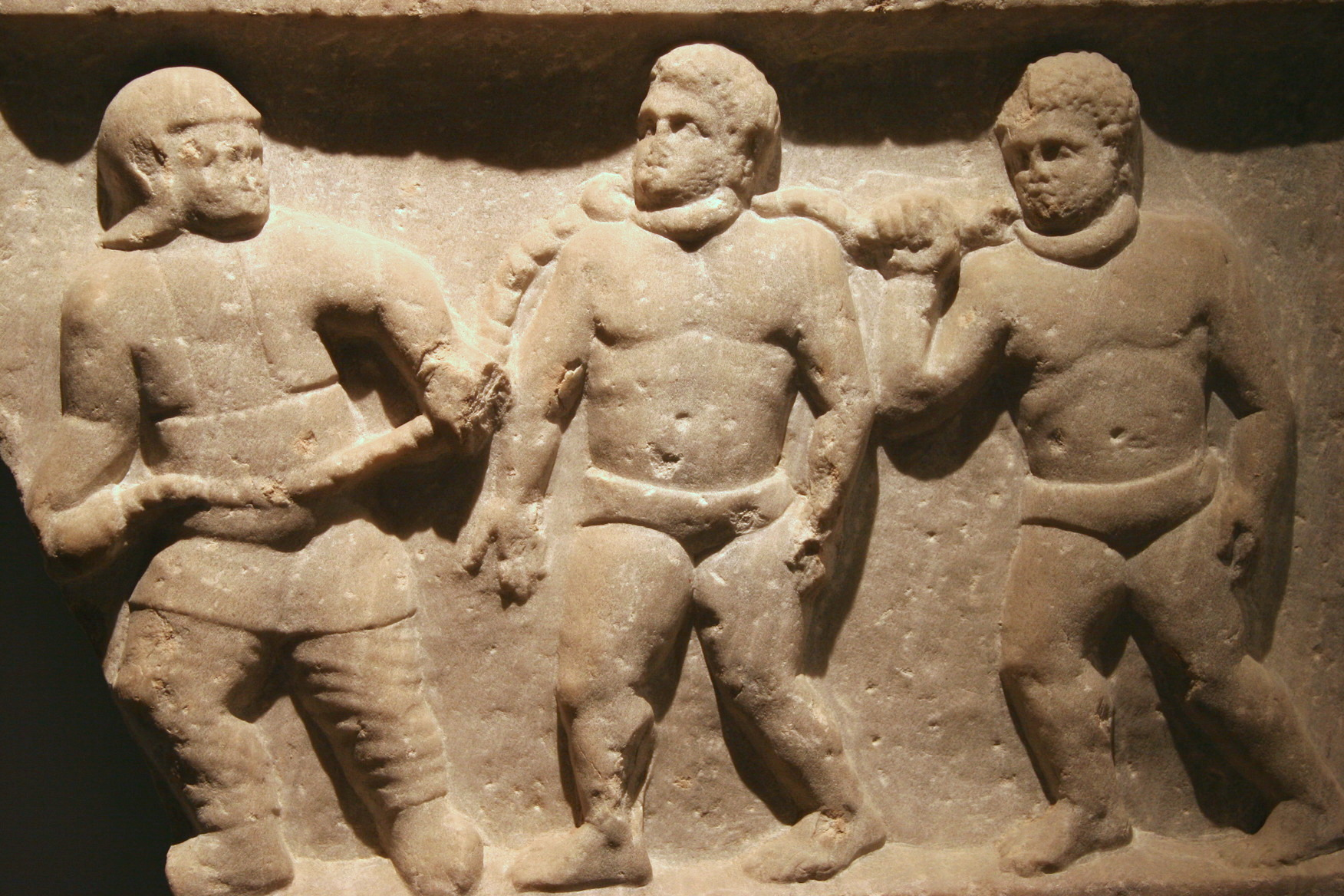
Relief from Smyrna (present-day Izmir, Turkey) depicting a Roman soldier leading captives in chains

=== Slavery in ancient Rome ===
In the Roman Republic and later Roman Empire, slaves accounted for most of the means of industrial output in Roman commerce. Slaves were drawn from all over Europe and the Mediterranean, including Gaul, Hispania, North Africa, Syria, Germania, Britannia, the Balkans, and Greece. Generally, slaves in Italy were indigenous Italians, with a minority of foreigners (including both slaves and freedmen) born outside of Italy estimated at 5% of the total in the capital, where their number was largest, at its peak.

Damnati in metallum ("those condemned to the mine") were convicts who lost their freedom as citizens (libertas), forfeited their property (bona) to the state, and became servi poenae, slaves as a legal penalty. Their status under the law was different from that of other slaves; they could not buy their freedom, be sold, or be set free. They were expected to live and die in the mines. Imperial slaves and freedmen (the familia Caesaris) worked in mine administration and management. In the Late Republic, about half the gladiators who fought in Roman arenas were slaves, though the most skilled were often free volunteers.

=== Slavery under Islamic rule ===
The "pençik" or "penç-yek" tax, meaning "one fifth", was a taxation based on a verse of the Quran; whereby one fifth of the spoils of war belonged to God, to Muhammad and his family, to orphans, to those in need and to travelers. This eventually included slaves, and war captives were given to soldiers and officers to help motivate their participation in wars.

Christians and Jews, known as People of the Book in Islam, were considered dhimmis in territories under Muslim rule, a status of second-class citizens that were afforded limited freedoms, legal protections, personal safety, and were allowed to "practice their religion, subject to certain conditions, and to enjoy a measure of communal autonomy" in return for paying the jizya and kharaj taxes. If a dhimmi broke his agreement and left Muslim territory for enemy land, he was liable to be enslaved – unless the dhimmi had left Muslim territory because he suffered injustice there.

Dhimmis were protected persons who could not be enslaved unless they violated the terms of protection. Such violations normally included rebellion or treason; according to some authorities this could also include failure to pay due taxes. Failure to pay tax could also result in imprisonment.

The Devshirme was a blood tax largely imposed in the Balkans and Anatolia in which the Ottoman Empire sent military to collect Christian boys between the ages of 8 and 18, who were taken from their families and raised to serve the empire. The tax was imposed by Murad I in the mid 1300s and lasted until the reign of Ahmet III in the early 1700s. From the mid to late 14th, through early 18th centuries, the devşirme–janissary system enslaved an estimated 500,000 to one million non-Muslim adolescent males. These boys would attain a great education and high social standing after their training and forced conversion to Islam. Basilike Papoulia wrote that "the devsirme was the 'forcible removal', in the form of a tribute, of children of the Christian subjects from their ethnic, religious and cultural environment and their transportation into the Turkish-Islamic environment with the aim of employing them in the service of the Palace, the army, and the state, whereby they were on the one hand to serve the Sultan as slaves and freedmen and on the other to form the ruling class of the State." When the Ottoman Empire allied with Muslim territories against Christian, slavery would be a major persistence in ensuring economic gain to both sides. This was showcased during the Battle of Barawa where Portuguese slaves were held captive by the Ajuran Empire and sold into slavery to the Ottomans after attacking the city of Barawa, Somalia.

=== Indentured servitude ===
In the 17th to 18th centuries, many white people in Britain, Ireland and European colonies in North America were indentured servants. Sterling Professor of History at Yale University David Brion Davis wrote that:

From Barbados to Virginia, colonists long preferred English or Irish indentured servants as their main source of field labor; during most of the seventeenth century they showed few scruples about reducing their less fortunate countrymen to a status little different from chattel slaves – a degradation that was being carried out in a more extreme and far more extensive way with respect to the peasantry in contemporary Russia. The prevalence and suffering of white slaves, serfs and indentured servants in the early modern period suggests that there was nothing inevitable about limiting plantation slavery to people of African origin.

Between 50 and 67 percent of white immigrants to the American colonies, from the 1630s and American Revolution, had traveled under indenture. Many women brought to the colonies were poor, some were abandoned or young girls born out of wedlock, others prostitutes or criminals. One ship's captain reportedly described them as a "villainous and demoralized lot". Many were transported against their will and for profit to Virginia and Maryland. The French transported women from the Salpêtrière prison for the homeless, insane and criminal to New Orleans.

Women held at Salpêtrière were bound in chains, flogged and lived in generally poor and unsanitary conditions. Female inmates, some of whom were sick with venereal disease, were forced to attend confessions three times each day where they would be whipped if their demeanor and behaviors were not acceptably penitent. In addition to Salpêtrière, the French transported women from other almshouses and hospitals including Bicêtre, Hôpital général de Paris and Pitié.

== White slave traffic ==
The International Agreement for the suppression of the White Slave Traffic is a series of anti–human trafficking treaties, the first of which was first negotiated in Paris in 1904. It was one of the first multilateral treaties to address issues of slavery and human trafficking. The Slavery, Servitude, Forced Labour and Similar Institutions and Practices Convention of 1926 and the International Convention for the Suppression of the Traffic in Women of Full Age of 1933 are similar documents.

=== International campaign against white slavery around 1900 ===
In Anglophone countries in the 19th and early 20th centuries, the phrase "white slavery" was used to refer to sexual enslavement of white women. It was particularly associated with accounts of women enslaved in Middle Eastern harems, such as the so-called Circassian beauties, which was a slave trade that was still ongoing in the early 20th century. The phrase gradually came to be used as a euphemism for prostitution. The phrase was especially common in the context of the exploitation of minors, with the implication that children and young women in such circumstances were not free to decide their own fates.

The slave trade in primarily white girls intended for the harems in the Ottoman Middle East attracted attention in the West. Attempting to suppress the practice, an Ottoman firman abolishing the trade of Circassians and Georgians was issued in October 1854. The decree did not abolish slavery as such, only the import of new slaves. However, in March 1858, the Ottoman Governor of Trapezunt informed the British Consul that the 1854 ban had been a temporary war time ban due to foreign pressure, and that he had been given orders to allow slave ships on the Black Sea passage on their way to Constantinople, and in December formal tax regulations were introduced, legitimizing the Circassian slave trade again. The so-called Circassian slave trade was to continue until the 20th century. The sex slave trade in white girls for sexual slavery (concubinage) did not stop, and the British travel writer John Murray described a batch of white slave girls in the Middle East in the 1870s:

"Their complexion are sallow, and none of them [sic] are even good looking. But the daily Turkish bath, protection from the sun, and a wholesome diet, working upon and excellent constitution, accomplish wonders in a short space of time".

An international campaign against the white slave trade started in several countries in the West in the late 19th century. Many of the procurers and prostitutes who had accompanied the British and French troops to Constantinople during the Crimean war in the 1850s opened brothels in Port Said in Egypt during the construction of the Suez Canal, and these brothels was a destination for many victims of the white slave trade, since they were under protection of the foreign consulates because of the capitulatory privileges until 1937 and therefore protected from the police.

In 1877 the first international congress for the abolition of prostitution took place in Geneva in Switzerland, followed by the foundation of the International Association of Friends of Young Girls (German: Internationale Verein Freundinnen junger Mädchen or FJM; French: Amies de la jeune fille); after this, national associations to combat the white slave trade was gradually founded in a number of nations, such as the Freundinnenverein in Germany, the National Vigilance Association in Britain and Vaksamhet in Sweden. Moral panic over the "traffic in women" rose to a peak in England in the 1880s, after the exposure of the Eliza Armstrong case and the internationally infamous White slave trade affair in the 1880s. In 1884, the Anglo-Egyptian Slave Trade Convention pressed upon Egypt by the British explicitly banned the sex slave trade of "white women" to slavery in Egypt; this law was particularly targeted against the import of white women (mainly from Caucasus and usually Circassians via the Circassian slave trade), which were the preferred choice for harem concubines among the Egyptian upper class.

The first international congress against prostitution and sex slave trade in Geneva in 1877, organized by the International Abolitionist Federation, was followed by conferences in 1899, 1904 and 1910. When the second international congress against white slave trade took place in London in 1899, where the International Bureau for the Suppression of the Traffic in Women and Children was founded to coordinate an international campaign. The International Abolitionist Federation (1875) and International Bureau (1899) where the two big pioneering organizations against the worldwide sex trade and conducted an international campaign via their local and national sub-sections and associated organizations in different countries. As a result of the campaign of the movement suggestions was put forward on how to combat the white slave trade in Paris in 1902, which eventually resulted in the International Agreement for the suppression of the White Slave Traffic in May 1904.

After World War I, the white slave trade or sex trafficking was addressed by the League of Nations, whose Advisory Committee on Traffic in Women and Children created the International Convention for the Suppression of the Traffic in Women and Children in 1921.

=== White Slave Traffic Act of 1910 ===
In 1910, the US Congress passed the White Slave Traffic Act (better known as the Mann Act), which made it a felony to transport women across state borders for the purpose of "prostitution or debauchery, or for any other immoral purpose". The Act was applied to a wide variety of offences, many of which were consensual in nature.

=== White slavery and race/gender in the US ===
While women were indeed victims of trafficking in the US, the public outcry about white slavery was mostly in response to racial anxieties about interracial contact. Local prosecutors in New York were the first to convict a defendant for "white slavery" case using the Mann Act. In People v. Moore, an all-white jury convicted Bella Moore, a mixed race woman from New York, for the "compulsory prostitution" of two white women, Alice Milton and Belle Woods. Another notable court case involved Jack Johnson. Using the Mann Act, federal prosecutors convicted Johnson of transporting his white girlfriend across state lines. During the first half of the 20th century, authorities disproportionately prosecuted women who were poor and/or racial/ethnic minorities using the Mann Act.

=== Criminal Law Amendment (White Slave Traffic) Bill ===
An attempt was made to introduce a similar law into the UK between 1910 and 1913 as the Criminal Law Amendment Act 1912. Arthur Lee would state in the House of Commons: "the United Kingdom, and particularly England, is increasingly becoming a clearing-house and depot and dispatch centre of the white slave traffic, and the headquarters of the foreign agents engaged in the most expensive and lucrative phase of the business." South America was stated as the main destination for the trafficked girls. The Spectator commented that "the Bill has been blocked by a member [alluding to Frederick Handel Booth] or members who, for various reasons consider that it is not a measure which ought to be placed upon the statute book" as it would affect the liberty of the individual.

== See also ==
- Slavery in medieval Europe
- Slavery in Africa
- Slave narrative § North African slave narratives
- Kapi Agha
- Ghilman
- Mamluk
- Turkish Abductions
- Guðríður Símonardóttir
- Jan Janszoon
- Ólafur Egilsson
- Rumelia
- Rumelia Eyalet
- Seljuk Empire
- 1926 Slavery Convention
- Slavery in antiquity
- White slave propaganda
- White-Slave Traffic Act
