= Convention for the Suppression of the Traffic in Persons and of the Exploitation of the Prostitution of Others =

1949 UN resolution

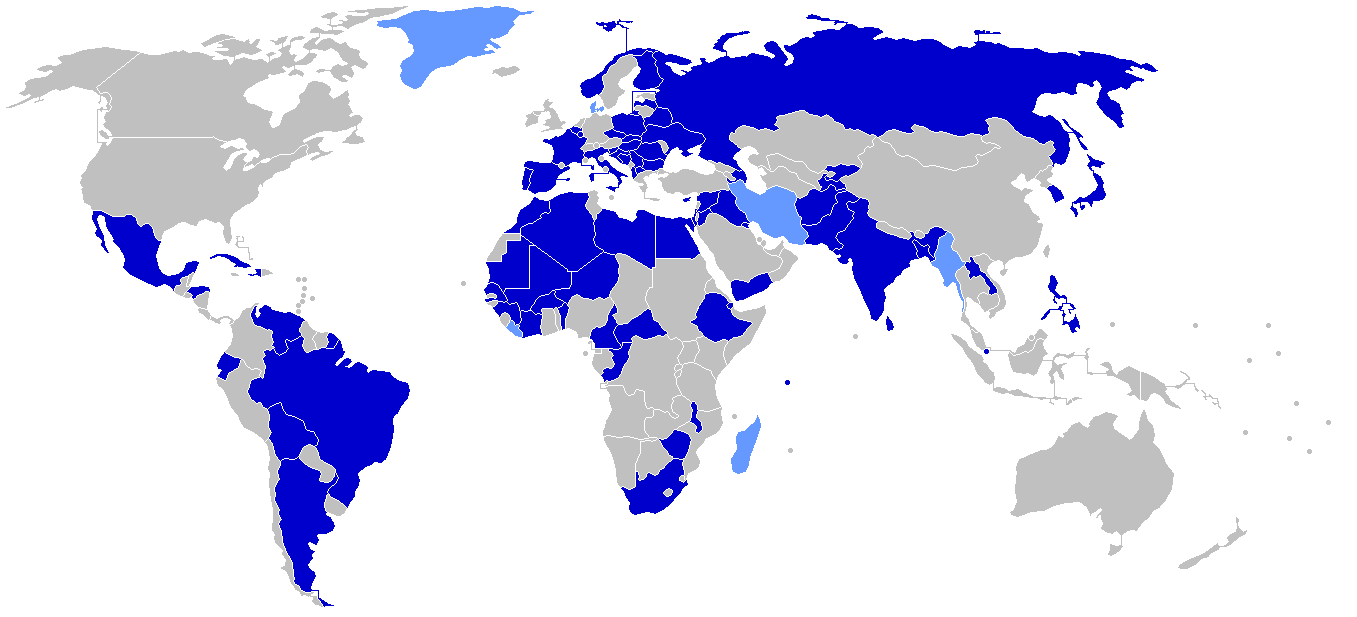
- States parties and signatories of the convention. States parties in dark blue. State signatories in light blue.
- Drafted: 2 December 1949 (approval by the UN General Assembly)
- Signed: 21 March 1950
- Location: Lake Success, New York
- Effective: 25 July 1951
- Condition: Ratification by 2 states
- Signatories: 25
- Parties: 82
- Depositary: UN Secretary-General

Full text
- Convention for the Suppression of the Traffic in Persons and of the Exploitation of the Prostitution of Others at Wikisource

The Convention for the Suppression of the Traffic in Persons and of the Exploitation of the Prostitution of Others was approved by the United Nations General Assembly on 2 December 1949 and entered into force on 25 July 1951. The preamble states:

Whereas prostitution and the accompanying evil of the traffic in persons for the purpose of prostitution are incompatible with the dignity and worth of the human person and endanger the welfare of the individual, the family, and the community.

As of December 2013, 82 states were party to the convention (see map). An additional 13 states had signed the convention, but had not yet ratified it.

The convention supersedes a number of earlier conventions that covered some aspects of forced prostitution. Signatories are charged with three obligations under the 1949 convention: prohibition of trafficking, specific administrative and enforcement measures, and social measures aimed at trafficked persons. The 1949 convention presents two shifts in perspective of the trafficking problem, in that it views prostitutes as victims of the procurers, and in that it eschews the terms "white slave traffic" and "women", using for the first time race- and gender-neutral language. To fall under the provisions of the 1949 convention, the trafficking need not cross international lines.

== Provisions ==
The convention requires state parties to punish any person who "procures, entices, or leads away, for purposes of prostitution, another person, even with the consent of that person ... exploits the prostitution of another person, even with the consent of that person" (Article 1), or runs a brothel or rents accommodations for prostitution purposes (Article 2). It also prescribes procedures for combating international traffic for the purpose of prostitution, including extradition of offenders.

Furthermore, state parties are required to abolish all regulations that subject prostitutes "to special registration or to the possession of a special document, or to any exceptional requirements for supervision or notification" (Article 6). And also, they are required to take the necessary measure for the supervision of employment agencies, in order to prevent persons seeking employment, in particular women and children, from being exposed to the danger of prostitution (Article 20).

A dispute between the parties relating to the interpretation or application of the convention may, at the request of any one of the parties to the dispute, be referred to the International Court of Justice (Article 22).

== Status ==
A number of countries who have ratified the convention expressed reservations in relation to the referral of disputes to the ICJ, and some countries have not ratified the convention at all because of their objection to the presence of the article.

One of the main reasons the convention has not been ratified by many countries is that it also applies to voluntary prostitution, because of the presence of the term "even with the consent of that person" in Article 1. For example, in countries such as Germany, the Netherlands, New Zealand, Greece, Turkey, and other countries, voluntary prostitution is legal and regulated as an "occupation".

The Trafficking Protocol (2000) to the United Nations Convention Against Transnational Organized Crime has used a different definition of "trafficking" to that in the 1949 convention, and has been ratified by many more countries.

The Centre for Human Rights, specifically the secretariat of the Working Group on Slavery, in close co-operation with the Centre for Social Development and Humanitarian Affairs of the Department of International Economic and Social Affairs, actively monitors the convention.

== See also ==
- Human trafficking
- International Abolitionist Federation
- International Convention for the Suppression of the Traffic in Women and Children
- International Day for the Abolition of Slavery
- Prostitution law
- Sexual slavery
