= Clifford G. Roe =

American financier and philanthropist

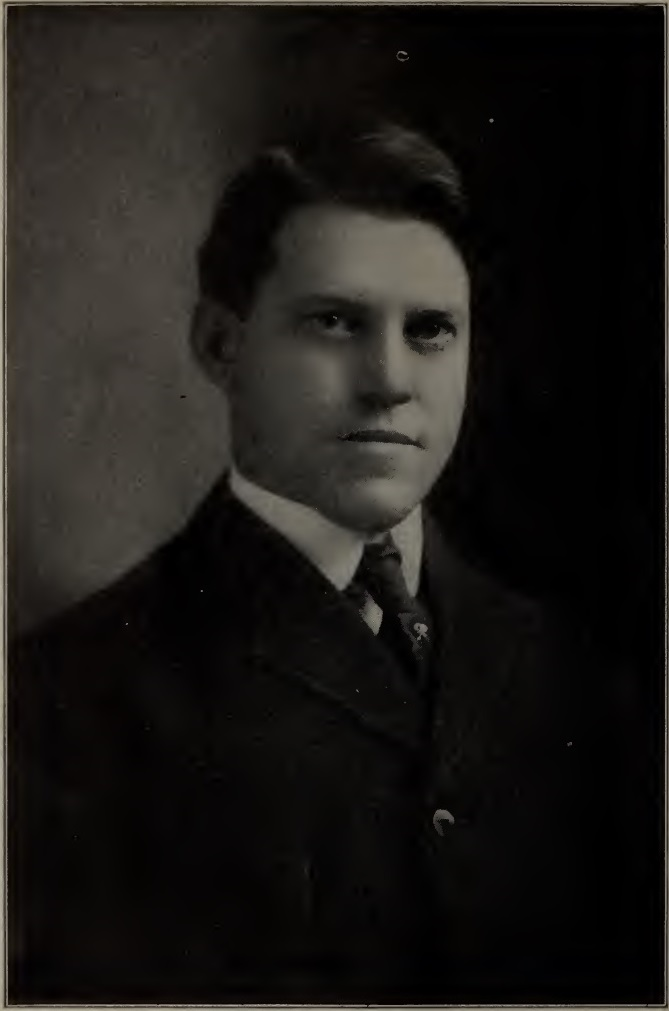
- Born: Clifford Griffith Roe; Indiana
- Education: University of Michigan
- Occupations: Attorney; Prosecutor; Assistant State's Attorney; Judge; General Counsel and Executive Secretary of the American Vigilance association;

Clifford Griffith Roe (1875–1934) was a Chicago prosecutor known for his efforts to fight prostitution and the trafficking of women for sex work, known as white slavery in the 1910s. He authored a comprehensive illustrated book on the subject in 1911 entitled, Horrors of the White Slave Trade: The Mighty Crusade to Protect the Purity of Our Homes.

== Early life and career ==
Roe was born in Indiana in 1875 to George W. Roe and Henrietta Drummond. Roe married Elsie Martha Hercock and had a child named Majorie H. Roe in 1912.

He became the assistant State's Attorney in Chicago, Illinois and became engaged in many infamous cases of human sex trafficking. He also became a member of The National Vigilance Committee for the United States of America and president of The American Alliance for the Suppression and Prevention of the White Slave Traffic.

== White slave trade ==
In the preface of Horrors of the White Slave Trade, Roe states:

"That the truth may be known throughout the world concerning the traffic in girls and women, and that these poor fellow beings may, though the knowledge of truth, be set free from bondage is the hope of the writers of this book."

Several anti-slavery techniques are described in detail in Horrors of the White Slave Trade. The book is an instruction manual on how to make effective change in the direction of justice and love of humanity, as demonstrated through the fight against white slavery toward the end of the 19th century and early 20th century.

== Works ==
- Panders and Their White Slaves (1910)
- Horrors of the white slave trade: the mighty crusade to protect the purity of our homes (1911)
- What Women might do with the ballot: The Abolition of the White Slave Traffic (1911)
- The girl who disappeared (c. 1914)
