= International Bureau for the Suppression of the Traffic in Women and Children =

The International Bureau for the Suppression of the Traffic in Women and Children (IBSTWC), also known as only the International Bureau, was a British organization, established in London in 1899. Its goal was to combat human trafficking, specifically what was then termed as the white slave trade; the trafficking in women and children for prostitution.

== History ==
The International Bureau was founded on a conference held by several women's organizations in London in 1899. It was an international sister-association to the British National Vigilance Association, who had been questioned by the Association for Moral and Social Hygiene (AMSH) for combatting prostitution as such more than helping the victims of sex trafficking and women's rights.

The International Bureau played an important role in the international debate and work against human trafficking, and arranged several well known international conferences about the white slave trade in the early 20th-century.

One of the main destinations for the victims of the white slave trade sex trafficking were brothels in Egypt operated by foreign residents. Many of the procurers and prostitutes who had accompanied the British and French troops to Constantinople during the Crimean war in the 1850s opened brothels in Port Said in Egypt during the construction of the Suez Canal, and these brothels was a destination for many victims of the white slave trade, since they were under protection of the foreign consulates because of the so called Capitulatory privileges until 1937, which exempted foreign citizens in Egypt from Egyptian law, and thus protected from the police. A local branch of the International Bureau for the Suppression of the Traffic in Women was therefore founded in Alexandria in 1904 and in Port Said in 1914 to address the issue. However, the European consulates in Egypt did not want to support a law against the sex trafficking because it would interfere with the Capitulatory privileges, and the brothel owners belonged to the most frequent clients of the consulates.
