= Vaksamhet =

Swedish anti-trafficking organization

- Vaksamhet
- Formation: 1902
- Founder: Hugo Tamm, Gertrud Adelborg, Clara Wahlström
- Dissolved: 1946
- Type: Anti-trafficking organization
- Purpose: Combat human trafficking, specifically sex trafficking
- Headquarters: Stockholm, Sweden
- Location: Sweden

The Vaksamhet (English: Vigilance) was a Swedish anti-trafficking organization, founded in 1902, and active until 1946.

Its goal was to combat human trafficking, specifically what was then termed as the white slave trade; the trafficking in women and children for prostitution and sexual slavery.

== History ==
In 1899, a congress against the prostitution and the white slave trade (sex trafficking) was held in London in Great Britain. It was attended by fifteen representatives from Sweden, among them the MP Hugo Tamm and Gertrud Adelborg of the Fredrika-Bremer-förbundet (FBF). Many European countries founded their own "National committee for the fight against the white slave trade", and the Swedish equivalent was Vaksamhet, which was co-founded by a group of abolitionists, including Hugo Tamm, Gertrud Adelborg and Clara Wahlström.

The organization was based in the capital of Stockholm, with a local branch in Gothenburg. It campaigned for harder legislation against sex trafficking (at that time known as the white slave trade) and collaboration across national borders, and maintained contact with their equivalent organizations in other countries. In order to protect women in situations identified as endangering, such as lonely female travellers in search of employment far from home, they controlled and recommended safe employment and accommodations abroad via an information bureau free of charge.

Clara Wahlström was the leading representative of Vaksamhet: she was a member of its board from 1902 to 1941, made several lecture tours, was the representative of Vaksamhet in both the Swedish press as well as at the international conferences of the international organization, the National Vigilance Association (NVA). Vaksamhet had many well known members and benefactors, such as the Royal family, including Margareta, Crown Princess, the families Hierta and Bonnier, Lydia Wahlström and Eva Fryxell. Ida von Plomgren was secretary and treasurer from 1927 and doctor and venereologist Gerda Kjellberg was a member.

Vaksamhet collaborated with the Swedish Federation (whose chair Hugo Tamm was one of the co-founders of Vaksamhet), and supported the opinion that legalized prostitution and licensed brothels were a contributing factor of the white slave trade and as such should also be eradicated.

== See also ==
- Internationaler Verein Freundinnen junger Mädchen
- National Vigilance Association
