= Internationaler Verein Freundinnen junger Mädchen =

The Internationaler Verein Freundinnen junger Mädchen (FJM) also known as Internationale Verein Freundinnen junger Mädchen (English: International Union of Friends of Young Women) was an international anti-trafficking organization, founded in Neuchâtel, Switzerland in 1877.

Its goal was to combat human trafficking, specifically what was then termed as the white slave trade: the trafficking of women and children for prostitution and sexual slavery.

Its Swiss section was renamed Compagna in 1999. Its mission was transformed to assist lonely travellers in general, such as elderly people or people who appear to need help in collective traffic. It operates under 7 separate associations.

== History ==
In 1877, the first international congress for abolitionists against prostitution, regulationism and sex trafficking was held in Geneva, Switzerland, hosted by the newly founded pioneer organization International Abolitionist Federation.

Following the congress, the international organization, the Internationale Verein Freundinnen junger Mädchen (FJM) was founded in Neuchâtel under the leadership of Marie Humbert-Droz.

FJM campaigned against the white slave trade (sex trafficking) by several methods. The most common active method was to identify and assist lonely girls who came from the countryside to the city to look for work, since these girls were the most common victims of the sex trade, and assist them with safe accommodations and looking for work.

In 1886, a national section of the FJM was founded in Switzerland, called Verein Freundinnen junger Mädchen on German and Amies de la jeune fille or L'Union internationale des Amies de la jeune fille (AJF) in French.

Another national section of the FJM was founded in Germany under the name Freundinnenverein.

=== Modern organization ===
After World War II, the FJM was transformed into an organization to assist lonely travellers in general, such as elderly people or people who appear to need help in collective traffic.

In 1999, the Swiss section changed its name to Compagna and moved its main office to Luzern. It operates under 7 separate associations under various names such as SOS Aide en Gare and Compagna Reisebegleitung, and also operates several hotels across Switzerland.

== See also ==
- Vaksamhet
- National Vigilance Association
