= International Convention for the Suppression of the Traffic in Women and Children =

1921 multilateral treaty

The International Convention for the Suppression of the Traffic in Women and Children is a 1921 multilateral treaty of the League of Nations that addressed the problem of international trafficking of women and children.

== Background ==
The growth of the social reform movement during the late 19th century gave momentum to international efforts by women's rights groups, social hygiene activists, and others, to address trafficking in women and children and its role in prostitution and labour exploitation. Previous international conventions had been ratified by 34 countries in 1901 and 1904, and 1910 as Convention for Suppression of White Slave Trade. The League of Nations, formed in 1919, quickly became the organization coordinating international efforts to study and attempt to end the practice. The work of the League in this area is considered to be one of its successes while overall it was a failure due to its inability to prevent war. The work of the League in this area was a central part of Evelyn Waugh's 1928 novel Decline and Fall.

== League of Nations ==
When it was established, the League of Nations at first did not include women's rights groups, who protested their exclusion and canvassed politicians for support. Ultimately, United States President Woodrow Wilson and France's Prime Minister Georges Clemenceau supported the participation of women's rights groups, who they argued were best suited to give a voice to women's issues. The League held the International Conference on White Slave Traffic in 1921, and agreed on the International Convention for the Suppression of the Traffic in Women and Children on 30 September 1921.

In 1933, it passed the International Convention for the Suppression of the Traffic in Women of Full Age.

== Key contents ==
The 1921 Convention ensure that protection from trafficking and sexual exploitation on the international level. The Article 6 states that "The High Contracting Parties agree, in case they have not already taken licensing and supervision of employment agencies and offices, to prescribe such regulations as are required to ensure the protection of women and children seeking employment in another country." and the Article 7 to "undertake in connection with immigration and emigration adopt such administrative and legislative measures as are required to check the traffic in women and children. In particular, they undertake to make such regulations as are required for the protection of women and children traveling on emigrant ships, not only at the points of departure and arrival, but also during the journey and to arrange for the exhibition, in railway stations and imports of notices warning women and children of the traffic and indicating the places where they can obtain accommodation and assistance."

== Impact ==
The 1921 Convention set new goals for international efforts to stem human trafficking, primarily by giving the anti-trafficking movement further official recognition, as well as a bureaucratic apparatus to research and fight the problem. The Advisory Committee on the Traffic of Women and Children was a permanent advisory committee of the League. Its members were nine countries, and several non-governmental organizations. An important development was the implementation of a system of annual reports of member countries. Member countries formed their own centralized offices to track and report on trafficking of women and children.

The advisory committee also worked to expand its research and intervention program beyond the United States and Europe. In 1929, a need to expand into the Near East (Asia Minor), the Middle East, and Asia were acknowledged. An international conference of central authorities in Asia was planned for 1937, but no further action was taken during the late 1930s.

== Reservations ==
To this 1921 Convention, some nations declare reservations; inter alia, Australia, British Empire, Japan, Spain and New Zealand reserve the application to the colonies, protectorate and mandated territories; India, Japan and Thailand reserve the Article 5 on limitation of age under 21 years old.

== Subsequent international law ==
The League of Nations disbanded with World War II, and was succeeded by the United Nations. The 1921 Convention thereby was replaced by the 1947 Protocol to amend the 1921 Convention for the Suppression of the Traffic in Women and Children, legislation tabled by the United Nations Secretary General on 12 November 1947. The 1947 Protocol was ultimately ratified by 46 countries. This Protocol was superseded by the Convention for the Suppression of the Traffic in Persons and of the Exploitation of the Prostitution of Others (1949) whose Preamble recalls the 1921 Convention together with 1910 Convention for Suppression of White Slave Traffic, and 1933 Convention on the Suppression of Traffic of Women of Full Age, again tabled by the United Nations Secretary-General.

== See also ==
- Human trafficking
- Child prostitution
- League of Nations
- Reform movement
- Prostitution law
- Social hygiene
- Sexual slavery
- Arab slave trade
- Karayuki-san
- Comfort women
- Slave Trade Acts
- German military brothels in World War II
- Convention for the Suppression of the Traffic in Persons and of the Exploitation of the Prostitution of Others
- United States House of Representatives House Resolution 121
