= National Vigilance Association =

Defunct British anti-prostitution organisation

The National Vigilance Association (NVA) was a British society established in 1885. Its goal was to combat prostitution, particularly forced prostitution by children. It has been described as the main social purity organization in the United Kingdom.

== History ==
The National Vigilance Association (NVA) was established August 1885 "for the enforcement and improvement of the laws for the repression of criminal vice and public immorality".

The Association was established in response to articles exposing child prostitution published by W. T. Stead in the Pall Mall Gazette. Stead became a member of its council.

It was founded to support the 1885 Criminal Amendment Act and enforce it by combating prostitution, rape and the abduction and kidnapping of women and girls for prostitution, and to protect women in risk of sexual exploitation.

The NVA was internationally active as a central international organization within the movement against the white slave trade, and was a British representative at the international congresses arranged with its equivalents in other nations to fight the international sex trade.

== See also ==
- Ladies National Association for the Repeal of the Contagious Diseases Acts
- Vaksamhet
- Internationaler Verein Freundinnen junger Mädchen
