= Sexual slavery =

Slavery with the intention of using the slaves for sex

Sexual slavery or sexual exploitation is an attachment of any ownership right over one or more people with the intent of coercing or otherwise forcing them to engage in sexual activities. This includes forced labor that results in sexual activity, forced marriage and sex trafficking, such as the sexual trafficking of children.

Sexual slavery has taken various forms throughout history, including single-owner bondage and ritual servitude linked to religious practices in regions such as Ghana, Togo, and Benin. Moreover, slavery's reach extends beyond explicit sexual exploitation. Instances of non-consensual sexual activity are interwoven with systems designed for primarily non-sexual purposes, as witnessed in the colonization of the Americas. This epoch, characterized by encounters between European explorers and Indigenous peoples, saw forced labor for economic gains and was also marred by the widespread prevalence of non-consensual sexual activities.

In some cultures, concubinage has been a traditional form of sexual slavery, one example being concubinage in Islam, in which however concubines had distinct rights and legitimate social status.

The Vienna Declaration and Programme of Action calls for an international effort to make people aware of sexual slavery and that sexual slavery is an abuse of human rights. The incidence of sexual slavery by country has been studied and tabulated by UNESCO, with the cooperation of various international agencies.

== Definitions ==
The 1988 Rome Statute, which defines the crimes over which the International Criminal Court may have jurisdiction, encompasses crimes against humanity (Article 7) which include "enslavement" (Article 7.1.c) and "sexual enslavement" (Article 7.1.g) "when committed as part of a widespread or systematic attack directed against any civilian population". It also defines sexual enslavement as a war crime and a breach of the Geneva Conventions when committed during an international armed conflict (Article 8.b.xxii) and indirectly in an internal armed conflict under Article(8.c.ii), but the courts jurisdiction over war crimes is explicitly excluded from including crimes committed during "situations of internal disturbances and tensions, such as riots, isolated and sporadic acts of violence or other acts of a similar nature" (Article 8.d).

The text of the Rome Statute does not explicitly define sexual enslavement, but does define enslavement as "the exercise of any or all of the powers attaching to the right of ownership over a person and includes the exercise of such power in the course of trafficking in persons, in particular women and children" (Article 7.2.c).

In the commentary on the Rome Statute, Mark Klamberg states:

Sexual slavery is a particular form of enslavement which includes limitations on one's autonomy, freedom of movement and power to decide matters relating to one's sexual activity. Thus, the crime also includes forced marriages, domestic servitude or other forced labor that ultimately involves forced sexual activity. In contrast to the crime of rape, which is a completed offence, sexual slavery constitutes a continuing offence. ... Forms of sexual slavery can, for example, be practices such as the detention of women in "rape camps" or "comfort stations", forced temporary "marriages" to soldiers and other practices involving the treatment of women as chattel, and as such, violations of the peremptory norm prohibiting slavery.

== Types ==
=== Commercial sexual exploitation of adults ===
Commercial sexual exploitation of adults (often referred to as "sex trafficking") is a type of human trafficking involving the recruitment, transportation, transfer, harboring or receipt of people, by coercive or abusive means for the purpose of sexual exploitation. Commercial sexual exploitation is not the only form of human trafficking and estimates vary as to the percentage of human trafficking which is for the purpose of transporting someone into sexual slavery.

The BBC News cited a report by UNODC as listing the most common destinations for victims of human trafficking in 2007 as Thailand, Japan, Israel, Belgium, the Netherlands, Germany, Italy, Turkey and the United States. The report lists Thailand, China, Nigeria, Albania, Bulgaria, Belarus, Moldova and Ukraine as major sources of trafficked persons.

In 2012, the International Labour Organization (ILO) reported 20.9 million people were subjected to forced labor, and 22% (4.5 million) were victims of forced sexual exploitation, 300,000 of them in Developed Economies and the EU. The ILO reported in 2016 that of the estimated 25 million persons in forced labor, 5 million were victims of sexual exploitation. However, due to the covertness of sex trafficking, obtaining accurate, reliable statistics poses a challenge for researchers.

=== Commercial sexual exploitation of children ===
Commercial sexual exploitation of children (CSEC) includes child prostitution (or child sex trafficking), child sex tourism, child pornography, or other forms of transactional sex with children. The Youth Advocate Program International (YAPI) describes CSEC as a form of coercion and violence against children and a contemporary form of slavery.

A declaration of the World Congress Against the Commercial Sexual Exploitation of Children, held in Stockholm in 1996, defined CSEC as, "sexual abuse by the adult and remuneration in cash or in kind to the child or to a third person or persons. The child is treated as a sexual object and as a commercial object".

==== Child prostitution ====
Child prostitution, or child sex trafficking, is a form of sexual slavery. It is the commercial sexual exploitation of children, in which a child performs the services of prostitution, usually for the financial benefit of an adult.

Child prostitution usually manifests in the form of sex trafficking, in which a child is kidnapped or tricked into becoming involved in the sex trade, or survival sex, in which the child engages in sexual activities to procure basic essentials such as food and shelter. Prostitution of children is commonly associated with child pornography, and they often overlap. Some people travel to foreign countries to engage in child sex tourism. Research suggests that there may be as many as 10 million children involved in prostitution worldwide. The practice is most widespread in South America and Asia, but prostitution of children exists globally, in undeveloped countries as well as developed. Most of the children involved with prostitution are girls, despite an increase in the number of young boys in the trade.

India's federal police said in 2009 that they believed around 1.2 million children in India to be involved in prostitution. A CBI statement said that studies and surveys sponsored by the Ministry of Women and Child Development estimated about 40% of India's prostitutes to be children.

Thailand's Health System Research Institute reported that children in prostitution make up 40% of prostitutes in Thailand.

In some parts of the world, child prostitution is tolerated or ignored by the authorities. Reflecting an attitude which prevails in many developing countries, a judge from Honduras said, on condition of anonymity: "If the victim [the child prostitute] is older than 12, if he or she refuses to file a complaint and if the parents clearly profit from their child's commerce, we tend to look the other way".

All member countries of the United Nations have committed to prohibiting child prostitution, either under the Convention on the Rights of the Child or the Optional Protocol on the Sale of Children, Child Prostitution and Child Pornography. Various campaigns and organizations have been created to try to stop the practice.

==== Child sex tourism ====
Child sex tourism is a form of child sex trafficking, and is mainly centered on buying and selling children into sexual slavery. It is when an adult travels to a foreign country for the purpose of engaging in commercially facilitated child sexual abuse. Child sex tourism results in both mental and physical consequences for the exploited children, that may include "disease (including HIV/AIDS), drug addiction, pregnancy, malnutrition, social ostracism, and possibly death", according to the State Department of the United States.

Child sex tourism has been closely linked to poverty, armed conflicts, rapid industrialization, and exploding population growth. In Latin America and Southeast Asia, for instance, street children often turn to prostitution as a last resort. Additionally, vulnerable children are easy targets for exploitation by traffickers. South Africa, the United States, Thailand, Cambodia, India, Nepal, the Dominican Republic, Kenya and Morocco have been identified as leading hotspots of child sexual exploitation. Also, child victim ages have been found in Cambodia, Myanmar, the Philippines, and Thailand to range from 6 to 11 years old, followed by 12 to 15 years old, and 15 to 17.

==== Child pornography ====
Child pornography, sometimes referred to as 'child abuse images', refers to images or films depicting sexually explicit activities involving a child. As such, child pornography is often a visual record of child sexual abuse. Abuse of the child occurs during the sexual acts which are photographed in the production of child pornography, and the effects of the abuse on the child (and continuing into maturity) are compounded by the wide distribution and lasting availability of the photographs of the abuse.

Child sex trafficking often involves child pornography. Children are commonly purchased and sold for sexual purposes without the parents knowing. In these cases, children are often used to produce child pornography, especially sadistic forms of child pornography where they may be tortured.

Child pornography is illegal and censored in most jurisdictions in the world. Ninety-four of 187 Interpol member states had laws specifically addressing child pornography as of 2008, though this does not include nations that ban all pornography.

=== Cybersex trafficking ===
Victims of cybersex trafficking, primarily women and children, are sex slaves who are trafficked and then forced to perform in live streaming shows involving coerced sex acts or rape on webcam. They are usually made to watch the paying consumers on shared screens and follow their orders. Cybersex trafficking is distinct from other sex crimes. Victims are transported by traffickers to 'cybersex dens', which are locations with webcams and internet-connected devices with live streaming software. There, victims are forced to perform sexual acts on themselves or other people in sexual slavery or raped by the traffickers or assisting assaulters in live videos. Victims are frequently ordered to watch the paying live distant consumers or purchasers on shared screens and follow their commands. It is often a commercialized, cyber form of forced prostitution.

=== Forced prostitution ===
Forced prostitution may be viewed as a kind of sexual slavery. The terms "forced prostitution" and "enforced prostitution" appear in international and humanitarian conventions but have been insufficiently understood and inconsistently applied. "Forced prostitution" generally refers to conditions of control over a person who is coerced by another to engage in sexual activity.

The issue of consent in prostitution is hotly debated. Legal opinions in places such as Europe have been divided over the question of whether prostitution should be considered a free choice or as inherently exploitative of women. The law in Sweden, Norway, and Iceland – where it is illegal to pay for sex, but not to sell sexual services – is based on the notion that all forms of prostitution are inherently exploitative, opposing the notion that prostitution can be voluntary. In contrast, prostitution is a recognized profession in countries such as the Netherlands, Germany, and Singapore.

In 1949 the UN General Assembly adopted the Convention for the Suppression of the Traffic in Persons and of the Exploitation of the Prostitution of Others (the 1949 Convention). Article 1 of the 1949 Convention provides punishment for any person who "[p]rocures, entices or leads away, for purposes of prostitution, another person" or "[e]xploits the prostitution of another person, even with the consent of that person." To fall under the provisions of the 1949 Convention, the trafficking need not cross international lines.

In contrast, organizations such as UNAIDS, WHO, Amnesty International, Human Rights Watch and UNFPA have called on states to decriminalize sex work in the global effort to tackle the HIV/AIDS epidemic, other STD-related health issues, and to ensure sex workers' access to health services.

=== Forced marriage ===
A forced marriage is a marriage where one or both participants are married, without their freely given consent. Forced marriage is a form of sexual slavery. Causes for forced marriages include customs such as bride price and dowry; poverty; the importance given to female premarital virginity; "family honor"; the fact that marriage is considered in certain communities a social arrangement between the extended families of the bride and groom; limited education and economic options; perceived protection of cultural or religious traditions; assisting immigration. Forced marriage is most common in parts of South Asia and sub-Saharan Africa.

=== Crime against humanity ===
The Rome Statute Explanatory Memorandum, which defines the jurisdiction of the International Criminal Court, recognizes rape, sexual slavery, forced prostitution, forced pregnancy, forced sterilization, "or any other form of sexual violence of comparable gravity" as crimes against humanity if the action is part of a widespread or systematic practice. Sexual slavery was first recognized as a crime against humanity when the International Criminal Tribunal for the former Yugoslavia issued arrest warrants based on the Geneva Conventions and Violations of the Laws or Customs of War. Specifically, it was recognized that Muslim women in Foča (southeastern Bosnia and Herzegovina) were subjected to systematic and widespread gang rape, torture and sexual enslavement by Bosnian Serb soldiers, policemen, and members of paramilitary groups after the takeover of the city in April 1992. The indictment was of major legal significance and was the first time that sexual assaults were investigated for the purpose of prosecution under the rubric of torture and enslavement as a crime against humanity. The indictment was confirmed by a 2001 verdict by the International Criminal Tribunal for the former Yugoslavia that rape and sexual enslavement are crimes against humanity. This ruling challenged the widespread acceptance of rape and sexual enslavement of women as an intrinsic part of war. The International Criminal Tribunal for the former Yugoslavia found three Bosnian Serb men guilty of rape of Bosniak (Bosnian Muslim) women and girls – some as young as 12 and 15 years of age – in Foča, eastern Bosnia and Herzegovina. The charges were brought as crimes against humanity and war crimes. Furthermore, two of the men were found guilty of the crime against humanity of sexual enslavement for holding women and girls captive in a number of de facto detention centers. Many of the women had subsequently disappeared.

In areas controlled by Islamic militants, non-Muslim women are enslaved in occupied territories. Many Islamists see the abolition of slavery as forced upon Muslims by the West and want to revive the practice of slavery. (See: Slavery in 21st-century Islamism). In areas controlled by Catholic priests, clerical abuse of nuns, including sexual slavery, has been acknowledged by the Pope.

=== Bride kidnapping and raptio ===
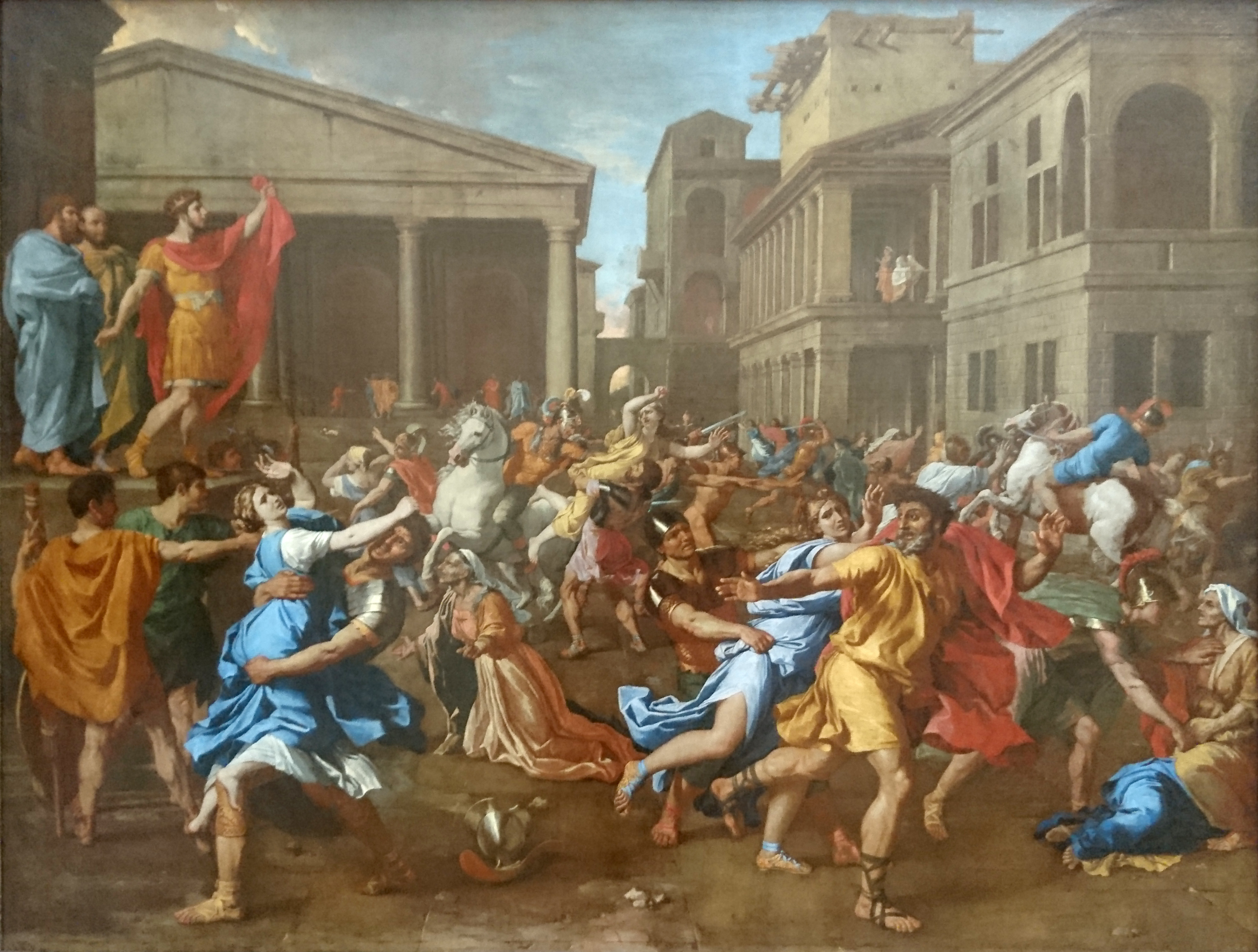
The Rape of the Sabine Women, by Nicolas Poussin, Rome, 1637–38 (Louvre Museum)

Bride kidnapping, also known as marriage by abduction or marriage by captive, is a form of forced marriage practiced in some traditional cultures. Though the motivations behind bride kidnapping vary by region, the cultures with traditions of marriage by abduction are generally patriarchal with a strong social stigma against sex or pregnancy outside marriage and illegitimate births. In most cases, however, the men who resort to capturing a wife are often of lower social status, whether because of poverty, disease, poor character or criminality. In some cases, the couple collude together to elope under the guise of a bride kidnapping, presenting their parents with a fait accompli. These men are sometimes deterred from legitimately seeking a wife because of the payment the woman's family expects, the bride price (not to be confused with a dowry, paid by the woman's family).

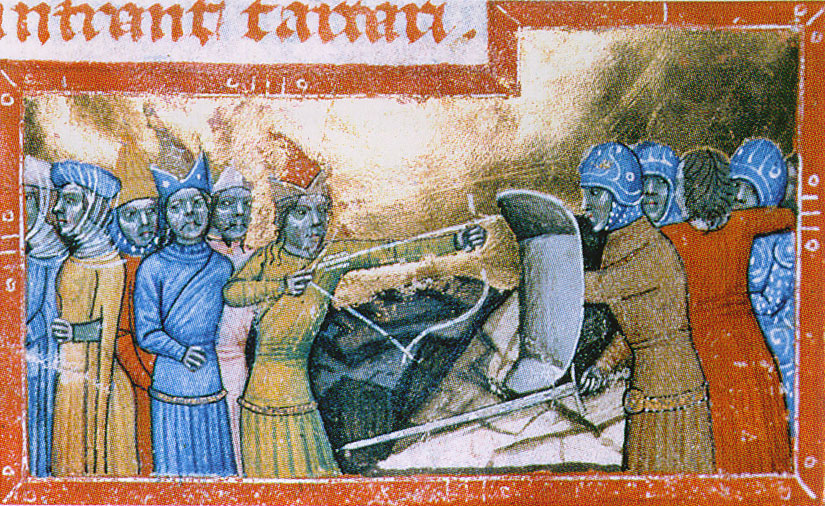
The Mongol invasion of Hungary. The Mongols, with captured women, are on the left, the Hungarians, with one saved woman, on the right.

Bride kidnapping is distinguished from raptio in that the former refers to the abduction of one woman by one man (and/or his friends and relatives), and is often a widespread and ongoing practice. The latter refers to the large-scale abduction of women by groups of men, most frequently in a time of war (see also war rape). The Latin term raptio refers to abduction of women, either for marriage (by kidnapping or elopement) or enslavement (particularly sexual slavery). In Roman Catholic canon law, raptio refers to the legal prohibition of matrimony if the bride was abducted forcibly (Canon 1089 CIC).

The practice of raptio is surmised to have existed since anthropological antiquity. In Neolithic Europe, excavation of a Linear Pottery culture site at Asparn-Schletz, Austria, unearthed the remains of numerous slain victims. Among them, young women and children were clearly under-represented, suggesting that perhaps the attackers had killed the men but abducted the young women.

=== Groom kidnapping ===
Groom kidnapping, colloquially known as Pakaruah shaadi or Jabaria shaadi, is a phenomenon in Bihar, more prominent in Munger and Dumka (now in Jharkhand) wherein eligible bachelors are abducted by the bride's family and later forcibly married, to get men with better education and/or richer men. Considering the traditional regard for the marriage sacrament, most such marriages are not annulled. Additionally, the groom may face false criminal charges under Indian dowry law, and end up fighting lengthy legal battles.

The practice became noticeable towards the late 20th century, as dowry costs became prohibitive and organised gangs came forward to carry out the abductions. In 2009, 1224 kidnappings for marriage were reported in Bihar, carried out on behalf of the families of the brides.

=== During armed conflict and war ===
Rape and sexual violence have accompanied warfare in virtually every known historical era. Before the 19th century, military circles supported the notion that all persons, including unarmed women and children, were still the enemy, with the belligerent (nation or person engaged in conflict) having conquering rights over them. "To the victor go the spoils" has been a war cry for centuries and women were included as part of the spoils of war. Institutionalized sexual slavery and enforced prostitution have been documented in a number of wars, most notably the Second World War (See #During the Second World War) and in the War in Bosnia.

== Historical cases ==
=== Ancient Greece and Roman Empire ===
Employing female and occasionally male slaves for prostitution was common in the Hellenistic and Roman world. Ample references exist in literature, law, military reports and art. A prostitute (slave or free) existed outside the moral codex restricting sexuality in Greco-Roman society and enjoyed little legal protection. See ancient Rome's law on rape as an example. Male intercourse with a slave was not considered adultery by either society.

=== Asia ===
Concubinage and sexual slavery was highly popular before the early 20th century all over East Asia. The main functions of concubinage for men was for pleasure and producing additional heirs, whereas for women the relationship could provide financial security. Children of concubines had lower rights in account to inheritance, which was regulated by the Dishu system. Slavery was commonly practiced in ancient China. During the Chinese rule of Vietnam, Nanyue girls were sold as sex slaves to the Chinese. A trade developed where the native girls of southern China were enslaved and brought north to the Chinese. Natives in Fujian and Guizhou were sources of slaves as well. Southern Yue girls were sexually eroticized in Chinese literature and in poems written by Chinese who were exiled to the south.

In the 16th and 17th centuries, some Portuguese visitors and their South Asian lascar and African crew members would engage in slavery in Japan; where they bought or captured young Japanese women and girls, who were either used as sexual slaves on their ships or taken to Macau and other Portuguese colonies in Southeast Asia, the Americas, and India. For example, in Goa, a Portuguese colony in India, there was a community of Japanese slaves and traders during the late 16th and 17th centuries.

Dutch colonial forces in Taiwan raided Liuqiu island in 1636 and 1642, enslaving the population. The women and children became servants and wives for the Dutch officers. Multiple Taiwanese aboriginal villages in frontier areas rebelled against the Dutch in the 1650s due to acts of oppression, such as when the Dutch ordered that aboriginal women be turned over to them for sex. During the 1662 Siege of Fort Zeelandia in which Chinese Ming loyalist forces commanded by Koxinga besieged and defeated the Dutch East India Company and conquered Taiwan, Dutch male prisoners were executed. Surviving women and children were enslaved, and a number of them were sold to Chinese soldiers to become their wives or concubines. A teenage daughter of the Dutch missionary Antonius Hambroek became a concubine to Koxinga.

In the 19th and early 20th centuries, there was a network of Chinese prostitutes trafficked to cities like Singapore, and a separate network of Japanese prostitutes being trafficked across Asia, in countries such as China, Japan, Korea, Singapore and India, in what was then known as the 'Yellow Slave Traffic'. There was also a network of prostitutes from Eastern Europe being trafficked to India, Ceylon, Singapore at around the same time, where they provided sexual services to European soldiers and civilians. Karayuki-san (唐行きさん; literally "Ms. Gone-to-China" but actually meaning "Ms. Gone Abroad") were Japanese girls and women in the late 19th and early 20th centuries who were trafficked from poverty stricken agricultural prefectures in Japan to destinations in East Asia, Southeast Asia, Siberia (Russian Far East), Manchuria, and India to serve as prostitutes and sexually serviced men from a variety of races, including Chinese, Europeans, native Southeast Asians, and others. The main destinations of karayuki-san included China (particularly Shanghai), Hong Kong, the Philippines, Borneo, Sumatra, Thailand, Indonesia, and the western USA (in particular San Francisco). They were often sent to Western colonies in Asia where there was a strong demand from Western military personnel and Chinese men. The experience of Japanese prostitutes in China was written about in a book by a Japanese woman, Tomoko Yamazaki. Japanese girls were easily trafficked abroad since Korean and Chinese ports did not require Japanese citizens to use passports and the Japanese government realized that money earned by the karayuki-san helped the Japanese economy since it was being remitted, and the Chinese boycott of Japanese products in 1919 led to reliance on revenue from the karayuki-san. Since the Japanese viewed non-westerners as inferior, the karayuki-san Japanese women felt humiliated since they mainly sexually served Chinese men or native Southeast Asians. Borneo natives, Malaysians, Chinese, Japanese, French, American, British and men from every race visited the Japanese prostitutes of Sandakan. A Japanese woman named Osaki said that the men, Japanese, Chinese, whites, and natives, were dealt with alike by the prostitutes regardless of race, and that a Japanese prostitute's "most disgusting customers" were Japanese men, while they used "kind enough" to describe Chinese men, and Western men were the second-best clients, while the native men were the best and fastest to have sex with.

During World War II, Imperial Japan organized a governmental system of "comfort women", which is a euphemism of military sex slaves for the estimated 200,000, mostly Korean, Chinese, and Filipino women who were forced into sexual slavery in Japanese military "comfort stations" during World War II. Japan collected, carried, and confined Asian women coercively and collusively to have sexual intercourse with Japan's soldiers during their invasions across East Asia and Southeast Asia. Some Korean women claim that these cases should be judged by an international tribunal as child sex violence. The legal demand has been made because of the victims' anger at what they see as the inequity of the existing legal measures and the denial of Japan's involvement in child sex slavery and kidnapping. On 28 December 2015, Japan and South Korea agreed to end the conflict "finally and irreversibly" and that Japan would pay 1 billion Yen into a fund for a Memorial Hall of comfort women. Despite this agreement, some Korean victims have complained that they were not consulted during the negotiation process. They maintain that Japan and Korea sought neither the legal recognition of their claim nor the revision of Japanese history textbooks.

=== Middle East ===
Slave trade, including trade of sex slaves, fluctuated in certain regions in the Middle East up until the 20th century. In ancient times, two sources for concubines were permitted under an Islamic regime. Primarily, non-Muslim women taken as prisoners of war were made concubines as happened after the Battle of the Trench, or in numerous later Caliphates. It was encouraged to manumit slave women who rejected their initial faith and converted to Islam, or to bring them into formal marriage.

Victims of the Arab slave trade and/or prisoners of war captured in battle from non-Arab lands often ended up as concubine slaves in the Arab World. These slaves came largely from Sub-Saharan Africa (mainly Zanj via the Trans-Saharan slave trade, Red Sea slave trade and Indian Ocean slave trade) and Central Asia (mainly Tartars via the Crimean slave trade) and the Caucasus (mainly Circassians via the Circassian slave trade).

Female slavery, being a condition necessary to the legality of this coveted indulgence [concubinage], will never be put down, with a willing or hearty co-operation by any Mussalman community.

— William Muir, Life of Mahomet.

In Muslim society in general, monogamy was common because keeping multiple wives and concubines was not affordable for many households. The practice of keeping concubines was common in the Muslim upper class. Muslim rulers preferred having children with concubines because it helped them avoid the social and political complexities arising from marriage and kept their lineages separate from the other lineages in society. Keeping slave concubines was the norm for many royal Muslim dynasties, from the royal Abbasid harem of the Abbasid Caliphate in the 9th-century until the harem of the Khedive of Egypt in the 19th-century a thousand years later.

The expansion of various Muslim dynasties resulted in acquisitions of concubines, through purchase from the slave trade, gifts from other rulers, and captives of war. To have a large number of concubines became a symbol of status. Almost all Abbasid caliphs were born to concubines. The custom to have concubines was common in all Islamic dynasties until the abolition of slavery in the 20th-century. Similarly, the sultans of the Ottoman Empire were often the son of a concubine. As a result, some individual concubines came to exercise a degree of influence over Ottoman politics. Some concubines developed social networks, and accumulated personal wealth, both of which allowed them to rise on social status.

Many of the female slaves became concubines. The most famous of the harems of Al-Andalus was perhaps the harem of the Caliph of Cordoba. The slaves of the Caliph were often European saqaliba slaves trafficked from Eastern Europe, and the female saqaliba were usually placed in the harem. The harem could contain thousands of slave concubines; the harem of Abd al-Rahman I consisted of 6,300 women. In the late Middle ages, Eastern European slaves were trafficked to the Middle East via the Balkan slave trade and later via the Italian Black Sea slave trade, in which female slaves could end up as concubines.

The Crimean slave trade was one of the biggest suppliers of women to the Ottoman Imperial Harem. The male Mamluk aristocrats of Ottoman Egypt, who themselves were often of white slave origin (often Circassian or from Georgia), preferred to marry women of similar ethnicity, while black slave women were used as domestic maids.

In contrast to the Atlantic slave trade where the male-female ratio was 2:1 or 3:1, the Arab slave trade usually had a higher female:male ratio instead, suggesting a general preference for female slaves. Ehud R. Toledano claims that female slaves from Africa were imported mainly for menial household labor than for reproduction; it was more common for female slaves from Caucasus to be used for reproduction, but also in their case their use as concubines have been exaggerated, and female slaves used in menial household jobs were not necessarily used for concubinage and childbearing. However, reproduction and sexual use was not synonymous in the Islamic world, since a man was allowed to use his female slave for sexual pleasure separate from reproduction; according to Islamic Law, a man had legal right to use contraceptives when having intercourse with his female slave in order to prevent offspring, which could result in his slave becoming an Umm walad and thus no longer legal to sell.

Aside from the female slaves used as concubines in private harems, female slaves were also used for prostitution. The Islamic Law formally prohibited prostitution. However, since Islamic Law allowed a man to have sexual intercourse with his female slave, prostitution was practiced by a pimp selling his female slave on the slave market to a client, who returned his ownership of her after 1–2 days on the pretext of discontent after having had intercourse with her, which was a legal and accepted method for prostitution in the Islamic world. This form of prostitution was practiced by for example Ibn Batuta, who acquired several female slaves during his travels.

When the Crimean slave trade was ended with the Annexation of the Crimean Khanate by the Russian Empire in 1783, the Circassian slave trade in so called Circassian beauties continued as a separate trade until the end of the Ottoman Empire. The Circassian slave trade was heavily focused on girls, bought to become wives or concubines (sex slaves) for rich men. To buy a daughter-in-law was seen as a good alternative when arranging a marriage, since she was likely to become a humble wife, lacking both her own money as well as relatives and completely dependent upon her in-laws.

The slave trade in primarily white girls intended for the harems attracted attention in the West. Attempting to suppress the practice, another firman abolishing the trade of Circassians and Georgians was issued in October 1854. The decree did not abolish slavery as such, only the import of new slaves. However, in March 1858, the Ottoman Governor of Trapezunt informed the British Consul that the 1854 ban had been a temporary war time ban due to foreign pressure, and that he had been given orders to allow slave ships on the Black Sea passage on their way to Constantinople, and in December formal tax regulations were introduced, legitimizing the Circassian slave trade again. The so-called Circassian slave trade was to continue until the 20th century. The sex slave trade in white girls for sexual slavery (concubinage) did not stop, and the British travel writer John Murray described a batch of white slave girls in the Middle East in the 1870s:

"Their complexion are sallow, and none of them [sic] are even good looking. But the daily Turkish bath, protection from the sun, and a wholesome diet, working upon an excellent constitution, accomplish wonders in a short space of time".

Chattel slavery, and thus the existence of concubines, lasted longer in some Islamic states. During the 20th century, the League of Nations founded a number of commissions, Temporary Slavery Commission (1924–1926), Committee of Experts on Slavery (1932) and the Advisory Committee of Experts on Slavery (1934–1939), which conducted international investigations of the institution of slavery and created international treaties to eradicate the institution worldwide. Slavery was eventually declared illegal at the global level in 1948 under the United Nations' Universal Declaration of Human Rights, followed by the Ad Hoc Committee on Slavery (1950–1951). By this time, the Arab world was the only region in the world where chattel slavery was still legal. Slavery in Saudi Arabia, slavery in Yemen and slavery in Dubai were abolished in 1962–1963, with slavery in Oman following in 1970.

Girls from Caucasus and the Circassian colonies in Anatolia were still trafficked to the Middle East in the 1920s; in 1928 at least 60 white slave girls were discovered for sexual purposes in Kuwait. The report of the Advisory Committee of Experts on Slavery (ACE) about Hadhramaut in Yemen in the 1930s described the existence of Chinese girls (Mui tsai) trafficked from Singapore for enslavement as concubines; the King and Imam of Yemen, Ahmad bin Yahya (r. 1948–1962), were reported to have had a harem of 100 slave women, and Sultan Said bin Taimur of Oman (r. 1932–1970) reportedly owned around 500 slaves, an estimated 150 of whom were women, who were kept at his palace at Salalah.

In the 1940s, it was reported that Baluchi girls were shipped via Oman to the Arabian Peninsula, where they were popular as concubines since Caucasian girls were no longer available, and were sold for $350–450 in Mecca. The legal sex slave trade to the Middle East was ended with the abolition of slavery in Saudi Arabia, slavery in Dubai and slavery in Oman in the 1960s.

=== White slavery ===
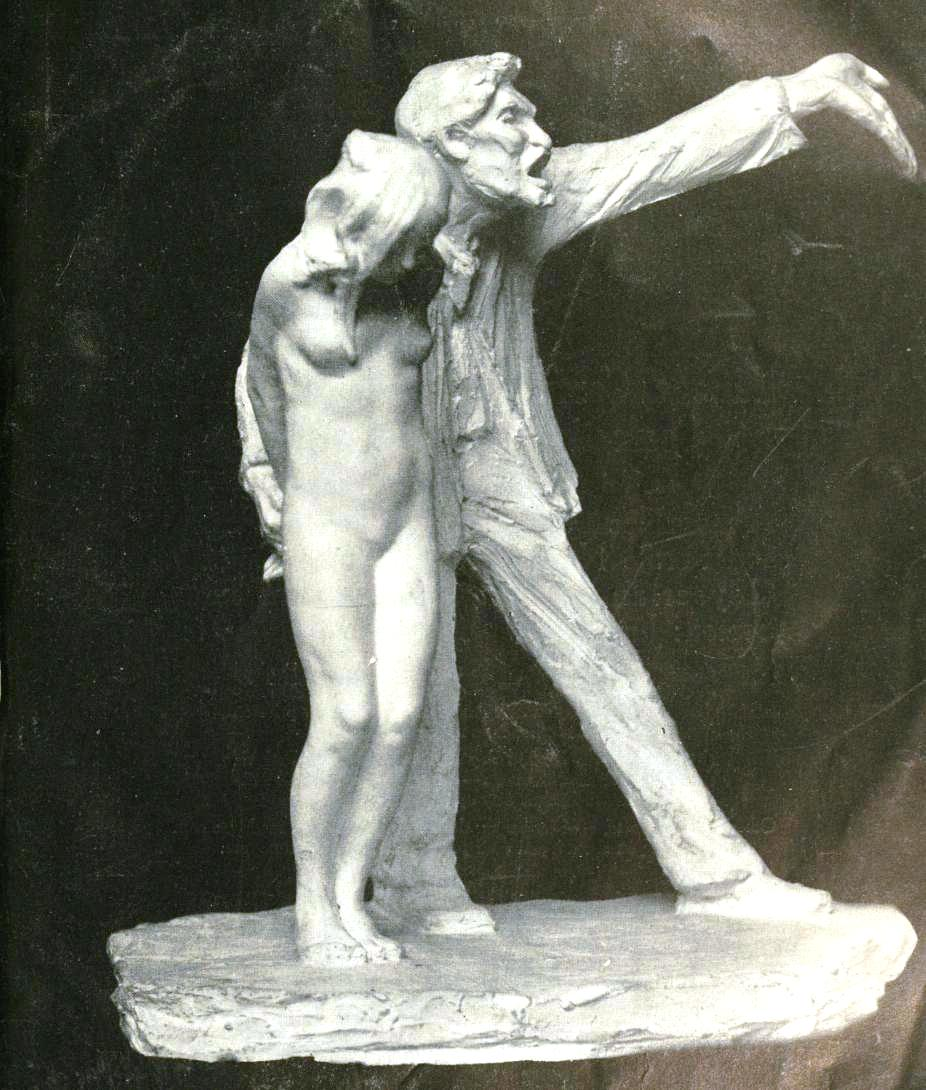
Statue entitled The White Slave by Abastenia St. Leger Eberle, a controversial sculpture meant to depict modern western sexual enslavement

In Anglophone countries in the 19th and early 20th centuries, the phrase "white slavery" was used to refer to sexual enslavement of white women. It was particularly associated with accounts of women enslaved in Middle Eastern harems, such as the so-called Circassian beauties, which was a slave trade that was still ongoing in the early 20th-century.

Circassians were identified as "white", and the slave trade of "white girls" to harems for sexual exploitation attracted attention in the international press and became an issue of concern for Western powers. In 1854, the Ottoman Empire banned the slave trade in "white women" with the firman of 1854 after pressure from Great Britain and France. However, in March 1858 the Ottoman Governor of Trapezunt informed the British Consul that the 1854 ban had been a temporary wartime ban due to foreign pressure, and that he had been given orders to allow slave ships on the Black Sea to pass on their way to Constantinople, and in December formal tax regulations were introduced, legitimizing the Circassian slave trade again.

In the 1850s the slave trade of "white girls" to the harems particularly attracted the attention of the international press, when the Ottoman slave market was flooded by Circassian girls due to the Circassian genocide, which resulted in the price for white slave girls to become cheaper, and Muslim men who were not able to buy white girls before now exchanged their black slave women for white ones. The New York Daily Times reported on August 6, 1856:

"There has been lately an unusually large number of Circassians going about the streets of Constantinople. [...] They are here as slave dealers, charged with the disposal of the numerous parcels of Circassian girls that have been for some time pouring into this market. [...] ...never, perhaps, at any former period, was white human flesh so cheap as it is at this moment. In former times a “good middling” Circassian girl was thought very cheap at 100 pounds, but at the present moment the same description of goods may be had for 5 pounds! [...] Formerly a Circassian slave girl was pretty sure of being bought into a good family, where not only good treatment, but often rank and fortune awaited her; but at present low rates she may be taken by any huxter who never thought of keeping a slave before. Another evil is that the temptation to possess a Circassian girl at such low prices is so great in the minds of the Turks that many who cannot afford to keep several slaves have been sending their blacks to market, in order to make room for a newly-purchased white girl."

There was a greater reluctance from Ottoman authorities to prohibit the Circassian slave trade than the African slave trade, because the Circassian slave trade was regarded as in effect a marriage market, and it continued until the end of the Ottoman Empire (1922). These reports about the sexual enslavement of "white" women in Eastern harems attracted attention in the West and contributed to the Western campaign against "white slavery" in the late 19th-century.

The phrase "white slavery" gradually came to be used as a euphemism for prostitution. The phrase was especially common in the context of the exploitation of minors, with the implication that children and young women in such circumstances were not free to decide their own fates.

In Victorian Britain, campaigning journalist William Thomas Stead, editor of the Pall Mall Gazette, procured a 13-year-old girl for £5, an amount then equal to a laborer's monthly wage (see the Eliza Armstrong case). Moral panic over the "traffic in women" rose to a peak in England in the 1880s, after the exposure of the internationally infamous White slave trade affair in 1880. At the time, "white slavery" was a natural target for defenders of public morality and crusading journalists. The ensuing outcry led to the passage of antislavery legislation in Parliament. Parliament passed the 1885 Criminal Law Amendment Act, raising the age of consent from thirteen to sixteen in that year.

An international campaign against the white slave trade started in several countries in the West in the late 19th-century. Many of the procurers and prostitutes who had accompanied the British and French troops to Constantinople during the Crimean war in the 1850s opened brothels in Port Said in Egypt during the construction of the Suez Canal, and these brothels were a destination for many victims of the white slave trade, since they were under protection of the foreign consulates because of the Capitulatory privileges until 1937 and therefore protected from the police. In 1877 the first international congress for the abolition of prostitution took place in Geneva in Switzerland, followed by the foundation of the International Association of Friends of Young Girls (German:Internationale Verein Freundinnen junger Mädchen or FJM; French: Amies de la jeune fille); after this, national associations to combat the white slave trade was gradually founded in a number of nations, such as the Freundinnenverein in Germany, the National Vigilance Association in Britain and Vaksamhet in Sweden.

In 1884, the Anglo-Egyptian Slave Trade Convention pressed upon Egypt by the British explicitly banned the sex slave trade of "white women" to slavery in Egypt; this law was particularly targeted against the import of white women (mainly from Caucasus and usually Circassians via the Circassian slave trade), which were the preferred choice for harem concubines among the Egyptian upper class.

In 1899 the first international congress against white slave trade took place in London, where the International Bureau for the Suppression of the Traffic in Women and Children was founded to coordinate an international campaign, and as a result of the campaign of the movement suggestions was put forward on how to combat the white slave trade in Paris in 1902, which eventually resulted in the International Agreement for the suppression of the White Slave Traffic in May 1904.

A subsequent scare occurred in the United States in the early twentieth century, peaking in 1910, when Chicago's U.S. attorney announced (without giving details) that an international crime ring was abducting young girls in Europe, importing them, and forcing them to work in Chicago brothels. These claims, and the panic they inflamed, led to the passage of the United States White-Slave Traffic Act of 1910, generally known as the "Mann Act". It also banned the interstate transport of females for immoral purposes. Its primary intent was to address prostitution and immorality.

Immigration inspectors at Ellis Island in New York City were held responsible for questioning and screening European prostitutes from the U.S. Immigration inspectors expressed frustration at the ineffectiveness of questioning in determining if a European woman was a prostitute, and claimed that many were "lying" and "framing skillful responses" to their questions. They were also accused of negligence should they accept a fictitious address from an immigrant or accept less-than-complete responses. Inspector Helen Bullis investigated several homes of assignment in the Tenderloin district of New York, and found brothels existed in the early 20th century in New York City. She compiled a list of houses of prostitutes, their proprietors, and their "inmates". The New York inspection director wrote a report in 1907, defending against accusations of negligence, saying there was no sense to the public "panic", and he was doing everything he could to screen European immigrants for prostitution, especially unmarried ones. In a report by the Commissioner General of Immigration in 1914, the Commissioner said that many prostitutes would intentionally marry American men to secure citizenship. He said that for prostitutes, it was "no difficult task to secure a disreputable citizen who will marry a prostitute" from Europe.

=== United States ===
From the beginning of African slavery in the North American colonies, the casual sexual abuse of African women and girls was common. It has been established by historians that white men raped enslaved African women, and this has also been supported by numerous genetic studies. As populations increased, slave women were taken advantage of by plantation owners, white overseers, planters' younger sons before and after they married, and other white men associated with the slaveholders. Some African slave women and girls were sold into brothels outright.

Plaçage, a formalized system of concubinage among slave women or free people of color, developed in Louisiana and particularly New Orleans by the 18th century, but it was fairly rare. White men had no obligation to trade anything for sex with black or mixed women. This left most of these women subject to the whims of white male pursuers. If another female caught his eye or the chosen women grew too old or too "difficult" in the minds of these white men these men could end the arrangement or continue the sexual contact without reward.

The advancement of mixed-race blacks over their darker counterparts has led to theory of consistent patronage by white fathers. While light-skinned Blacks certainly enjoyed a level of privilege, there is little proof that most received educations and dowries directly from their white fathers. Most light-skinned blacks lived off of compensatory benefit received one to three generations early; and expanded on this usually in black and mixed-race enclaves where they could own businesses and earn a living as the educated/trained "blacks". These compensatory benefits occasionally came from white grand or great grandfathers. Other times, they came from former slave masters rewarding prized mixed-race slaves for years of service in "the house" or as close assistants to the Master (a position that darker black people were afforded less often). A small portion of white fathers would pay for the education of their mixed-race children, especially sons, who might be educated in France. Why Black females of African descent are consistently ascribed such different experiences from white, Asian, and indo-native females when discussing sexual slavery and abuse, has long been a topic of debate.

From the 17th century, Virginia and other colonies passed laws determining the social status of children born in the colonies. Under the common law system in the colonies, children took the status of the father when it came to legal matters. To settle the issue of the status of children born in the colony, the Virginian House of Burgesses passed a law in 1662 that ruled that children would take the status of their mother at birth, under the Roman legal principle known as partus sequitur ventrem. Thus all children born to enslaved mothers were legally slaves, regardless of the paternity or ancestry of their fathers. They were bound for life and could be sold like any slave unless formally freed.

The term "white slaves" was sometimes used for those mixed-race or mulatto slaves who had a visibly high proportion of European ancestry. Among the most notable at the turn of the 19th century was Sally Hemings, who was 3/4 white and believed by historians to be a half sister of Martha Wayles Skelton Jefferson by their common father John Wayles. Hemings is known for having four surviving children from her decades-long concubinage with President Thomas Jefferson; they were 7/8 European by ancestry. Three of these mixed-race children passed easily into white society as adults (Jefferson freed them all – two informally and two in his will). Three of his Hemings grandsons served as white men in the Union Regular Army in the American Civil War; John Wayles Jefferson advanced to the rank of colonel.

Not all white fathers abandoned their slave children; some provided them with education, apprenticeships, or capital; a few wealthy planters sent their mixed-race children to the North for education and sometimes for freedom. Some men freed both their enslaved women and their mixed-race children, especially in the 20 years after the American Revolution, but southern legislatures made such manumissions more difficult. Both Mary Chesnut and Fanny Kemble wrote in the 19th century about the scandal of white men having enslaved Black women and natural mixed-race children as part of their extended households. Numerous mixed-race families were begun before the Civil War, and many originated in the Upper South.

Zora Neale Hurston wrote about contemporary sexual practices in her anthropological studies in the 1930s of the turpentine camps of North Florida. She noted that white men with power often forced black women into sexual relationships.

Although she never named the practice as "paramour rights", author C. Arthur Ellis ascribed this term to the fictionalized Hurston in his book, Zora Hurston and the Strange Case of Ruby McCollum. The same character asserted that the death knell of paramour rights was sounded by the trial of Ruby McCollum, a black woman who murdered Dr. C. Leroy Adams, in Live Oak, Florida, in 1952. McCollum had testified that Adams forced her into sex and bearing his child. Journalist Hurston covered McCollum's trial in 1952 for the Pittsburgh Courier. McCollum's case was further explored in the 2015 documentary You Belong to Me: Sex, Race and Murder in the South.

The Chinese Tanka females were sold from Guangzhou to work as prostitutes for the overseas Chinese male community in the United States. During the California Gold Rush in the late 1840s, Chinese merchants transported thousands of young Chinese girls, including babies, from China to the United States. They sold the girls into sexual slavery within the red light district of San Francisco. Girls could be bought for $40 (about $1455 in 2023 dollars) in Guangzhou and sold for $400 (about $14,550 in 2023 dollars) in the United States. Many of these girls were forced into opium addiction and lived their entire lives as prostitutes.

=== During the Second World War ===
==== Germany during World War II ====
During World War II, Germany established brothels in Nazi concentration camps (Lagerbordell). The women forced to work in these brothels came from the Ravensbrück concentration camp, Soldier's brothels (Wehrmachtsbordell) were usually organized in already established brothels or in hotels confiscated by the Germans. The leaders of the Wehrmacht became interested in running their own brothels when sexual disease spread among the soldiers. In the controlled brothels, the women were checked frequently to avoid and treat sexually transmittable infections (STI).

It is estimated that a minimum of 34,140 women from occupied states were forced to work as prostitutes in Nazi Germany. In occupied Europe, the local women were often forced into prostitution. On 3 May 1941 the Foreign Ministry of the Polish government-in-exile issued a document describing the mass Nazi raids made in Polish cities with the goal of capturing young women, who later were forced to work in brothels used by German soldiers and officers. Women often tried to escape from such facilities, with at least one mass escape known to have been attempted by women in Norway.

==== Japan during World War II ====
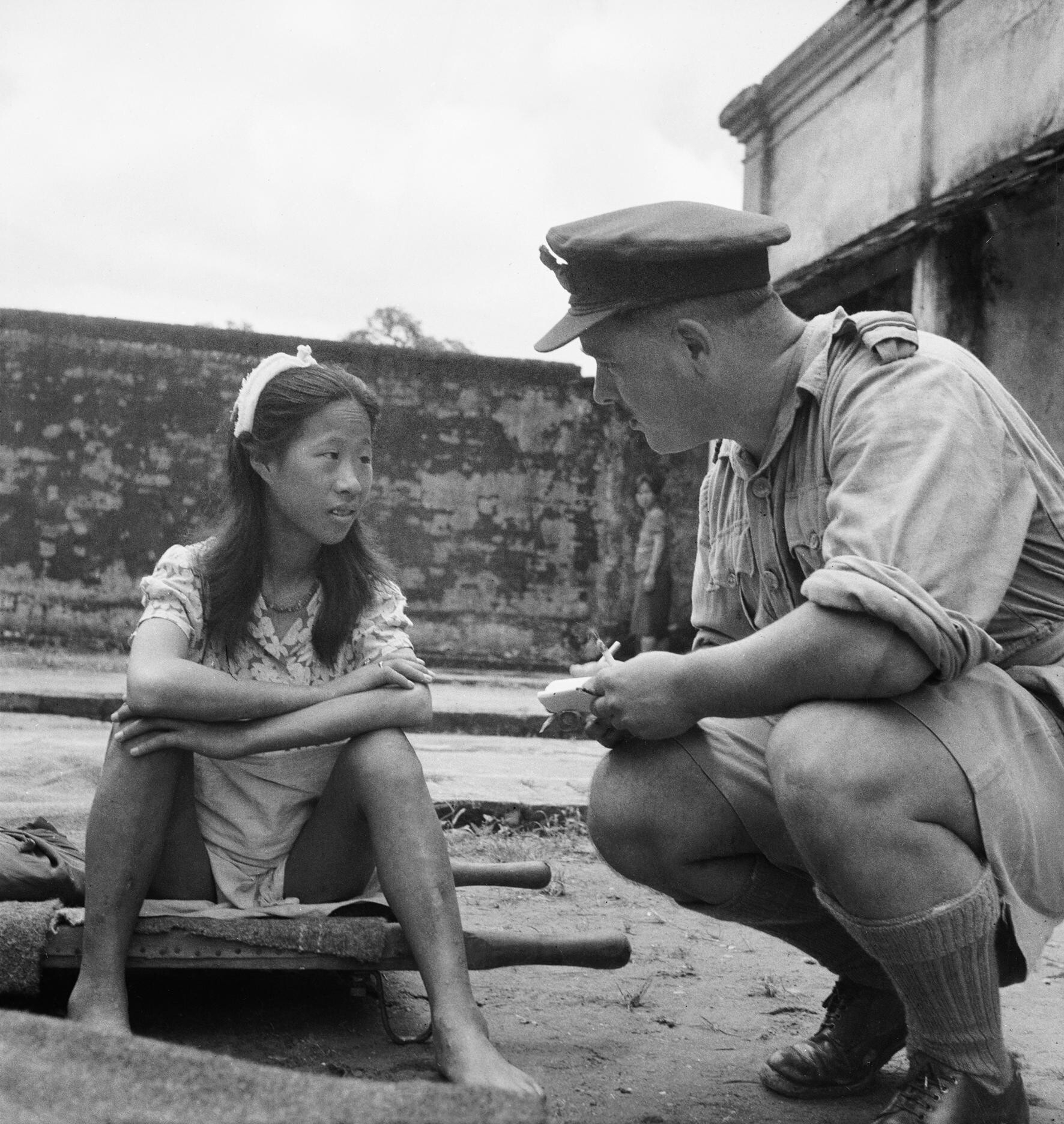
Rangoon, Burma. 8 August 1945. A young ethnic Chinese woman from one of the Imperial Japanese Army's "comfort battalions" is interviewed by an RAF officer.

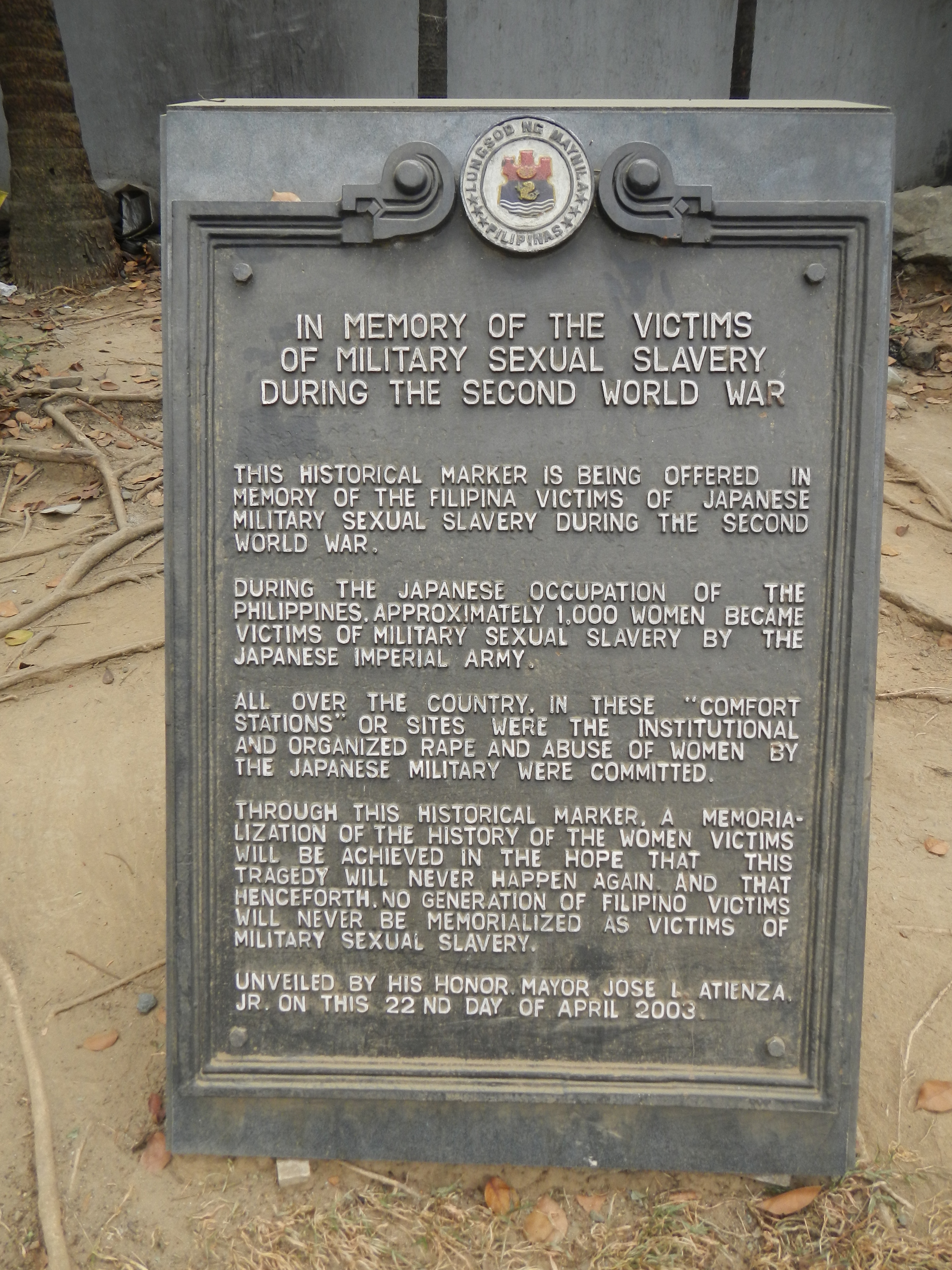
Historical Marker, in the memory of Comfort women; Plaza Lawton, Liwasang Bonifacio, Manila

"Comfort women" are a widely publicized example of sexual slavery. The term refers to the women, from occupied countries, who were forced to serve as sex slaves in the Japanese army's camps during World War II. Estimates vary as to how many women were involved, with numbers ranging from as low as 20,000 from some Japanese scholars to as high as 410,000 from some Chinese scholars. The numbers are still being researched and debated. The majority of women were taken from Korea, China, and other occupied territories part of the Greater East Asia Co-Prosperity Sphere. They were often recruited by kidnapping or deception to serve as sex slaves. Each slave reportedly suffered "an average of 10 rapes per day (considered by some to be a low estimate), for a five-day work week; this figure can be extrapolated to estimate that each 'comfort girl' was raped around 50 times per week or 2,500 times per year. For three years of service – the average – a comfort girl would have been raped 7,500 times." (Parker, 1995 United Nations Commissions on Human Rights)

Chuo University professor Yoshiaki Yoshimi states there were about 2,000 centers where as many as 200,000 Japanese, Chinese, Korean, Filipino, Taiwanese, Burmese, Indonesian, Dutch and Australian women were interned and used as sex slaves.

=== After World War II ===
Israel

During the Nakba in 1948, Zionist militias forced Palestinian women and girls into sexual enslavement. First hand accounts admitting to this practice have been published in Haaretz, including one account from August 1949. Due to military archive seal that was lifted in 2003, the personal diary entries of David Ben-Gurion were revealed. These entries exposed that Zionist soldiers had abducted a Palestinian Bedouin girl from the Naqab [Negev], forcing her into sexual enslavement at the to the Nirim military outpost, and that soldiers gang raped her repeatedly. The militias eventually confessed to killing and burying her and Ben Gurion's diary entry also reveals that high ranking military officials knew of this specific case. His entry noted: “It was decided and carried out: They washed her, cut her hair, raped her, and killed her.”

The platoon commander, who went by the name Moshe, incited twenty-two soldiers under his command to sexually assault the teenage girl. During a speech to his men on the importance of Zionism, Moshe gave his men two choices regarding what to do with their Palestinian captive: “She was either to become a kitchen worker or their sex slave.” In reply, the soldiers chanted, “We want to fuck!” Moshe then arranged a three-day schedule where multiple men from three Zionist paramilitary squads were to trade turns raping the Palestinian hostage. After falling unconscious from the abuse on the first night, the teenage girl woke up the next morning resisting the perpetrators. She was then executed and buried under Moshe's command. Haaretz newspaper published the direct transcript of Moshe's confession:

"Nirim Outpost.

To: Company Commander.

From: Commander,

Re: Report on the captive In my patrol on 12.8.49

I encountered Arabs in the territory under my command, one of them armed. I killed the armed Arab on the spot and took his weapon. I took the Arab female captive. On the first night the soldiers abused her and the next day I saw fit to remove her from the world. Signed: Moshe, second lieutenant."

Moshe and three soldiers were later tried in secret for the murder, but not the rape and sexual enslavement, showing how sexual enslavement is likely to have been a practice sanctioned by early Zionist paramilitary forces. The incident is commonly known as the Nirim affair and has been written about in Palestinian literature and reports on Israel's systemic sexualized violence against Palestinians since the 1948 Nakba.

==== Japan ====
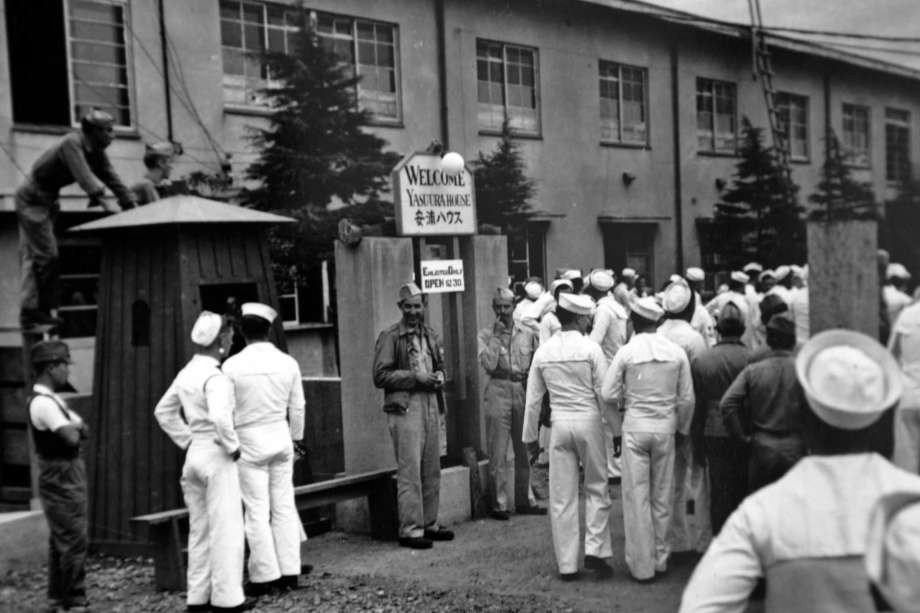
Yasuura House, one such center

The Recreation and Amusement Association (特殊慰安施設協会, Tokushu Ian Shisetsu Kyōkai) (RAA) was the largest of the organizations established by the Japanese government to provide organized prostitution and other leisure facilities for occupying Allied troops immediately following World War II.

The RAA established its first brothel on 28 August: the Komachien in Ōmori. By December 1945, the RAA owned 34 facilities, 16 of which were "comfort stations". The total number of prostitutes employed by the RAA amounted to 55,000 at its peak.

The dispersal of prostitution made it harder for GHQ to control STIs and also caused an increase in rapes by GIs, from an average of 40 a day before the SCAP order to an estimated 330 per day immediately after.

=== During the Korean War ===
During the Korean War, the South Korean military institutionalized a "special comfort unit" similar to the one used by the Japanese military during World War II, kidnapping and pressing several North Korean women into sexual slavery. Until recently, very little was known about this apart from testimonies of retired generals and soldiers who had fought in the war. In February 2002, Korean sociologist Kim Kwi-ok wrote the first scholarly work on Korea's comfort women through official records.

The South Korean "comfort" system was organized around three operations. First, there were "special comfort units" called Teugsu Wiandae (특수위안대, 特殊慰安隊), which operated from seven different stations. Second, there were mobile units of comfort women that visited barracks. Third, there were prostitutes who worked in private brothels that were hired by the military. Although it is still not clear how recruitment of these comfort women was organized in the South, South Korean agents were known to have kidnapped some of the women from the North.

According to anthropologist Chunghee Sarah Soh, the South Korean military's use of comfort women has produced "virtually no societal response", despite the country's women's movement's support for Korean comfort women within the Japanese military. Both Kim and Soh argue that this system is a legacy of Japanese colonialism, as many of Korea's army leadership were trained by the Japanese military. Both the Korean and Japanese militaries referred to these comfort women as "military supplies" in official documents and personal memoirs. The South Korean armed forces also used the same arguments as the Japanese military to justify the use of comfort women, viewing them as a "necessary social evil" that would raise soldiers' morale and prevent rape.

== Present day ==
Official estimates of individuals in sexual slavery worldwide vary. In 2001 the International Organization for Migration estimated 400,000, the Federal Bureau of Investigation estimated 700,000 and UNICEF estimated 1.75 million.

=== Africa ===
In Africa, the European colonial powers abolished slavery in the nineteenth and twentieth centuries. However, in areas outside their jurisdiction, such as the Mahdist empire in Sudan, the practice continued to thrive. Institutional slavery has been banned worldwide, but there are numerous reports of women sex slaves in areas without effective government control, such as Sudan, Liberia, Sierra Leone, northern Uganda, Congo, Niger and Mauritania. In Ghana, Togo and Benin, a form of religious prostitution known as trokosi ("ritual servitude") forcibly keeps thousands of girls and women in traditional shrines as "wives of the gods", where priests perform the sexual function in place of the gods.

In April 2014, Boko Haram kidnapped 276 female students from Chibok, Borno, a state of Nigeria. More than 50 of them soon escaped, but the remainder have not been released. Instead, Abubakar Shekau, who had a reward of $7 million offered by the United States Department of State for information leading to his capture, announced his intention of selling them into slavery.

=== Americas ===
The San Francisco Chronicle reported in 2006 that in the 21st century, women, mostly from South America, Southeast Asia, and the former Soviet Union, are trafficked into the United States for the purposes of sexual slavery. A 2006 ABC News story stated that, contrary to existing misconceptions, American citizens may also be coerced into sex slavery.

The San Francisco Gate reported that San Francisco is one of the centers of sexual slavery in the United States. Most of the victims trafficked in San Francisco are women from East Asia, with women of Korean descent being particularly over-represented among the victims. There is extremely high demand for women of East Asian descent in the sex industry in the United States. In one case, all 100 women detained at a massage parlor in San Francisco were Korean. According to San Francisco police, the number of Asian massage parlors in San Francisco increased by 100% between 2004 and 2006, owing to the extreme profitability of the industry. The report described a sense of urgency among San Francisco authorities regarding the widespread trafficking of East Asian immigrant women.

In 2001 the United States State Department estimated that 50,000 to 100,000 women and girls are trafficked each year into the United States. In 2003, the State Department report estimated that a total of 18,000 to 20,000 individuals were trafficked into the United States for either forced labor or sexual exploitation. The June 2004 report estimated the total trafficked annually at between 14,500 and 17,500. The Bush administration set up 42 Justice Department task forces and spent more than $150 million on attempts to reduce human trafficking. However, in the seven years since the law was passed, the administration has identified only 1,362 victims of human trafficking brought into the United States since 2000, nowhere near the 50,000 or more per year the government had estimated.

The Girl's Education & Mentoring Services (GEMS), an organization based in New York, claims that the majority of girls in the sex trade were abused as children. Poverty and a lack of education play major roles in the lives of many women in the sex industry.

According to a report conducted by the University of Pennsylvania, anywhere from 100,000 up to 300,000 American children at any given time may be at risk of exploitation due to factors such as drug use, homelessness, or other factors connected with increased risk for commercial sexual exploitation. However, the report emphasized, "The numbers presented in these exhibits do not, therefore, reflect the actual number of cases of CSEC in the United States but, rather, what we estimate to be the number of children 'at risk' of commercial sexual exploitation."

The 2010 Trafficking in Persons report described the United States as, "a source, transit, and destination country for men, women, and children subjected to trafficking in persons, specifically forced labor, debt bondage, and forced prostitution". Sexual slavery in the United States may occur in multiple forms and in multiple venues. Sex trafficking in the United States may be present in Asian massage parlors, Mexican cantina bars, residential brothels, or street-based pimp-controlled prostitution. The anti-trafficking community in the United States is debating the extent of sexual slavery. Some groups argue that exploitation is inherent in the act of commercial sex, while other groups take a stricter approach to defining sexual slavery, considering an element of force, fraud or coercion to be necessary for sex slavery to exist.

The prostitutes in illegal massage parlors may be forced to work out of apartment complexes for many hours a day. Many clients may not realize that some of the women who work in these massage sex parlors have actually been forced into prostitution. The women may initially be lured into the US under false pretenses. In huge debt to their 'owners', they are forced to earn enough to eventually "buy" their freedom. In some cases women who have been sex trafficked may be forced to undergo plastic surgery or abortions. A chapter in The Slave Next Door (2009) reports that human trafficking and sexual enslavement are not limited to any specific location or social class. It concludes that individuals in society need to be alert to report suspicious behavior, because the psychological and physical abuse occurs which can often leave a victim unable to escape on their own.

In 2000 Congress created the Victims of Trafficking and Violence Protection Act with tougher punishments for sex traffickers. It provides for the possibility for former sex slaves to obtain a T-1 visa. To obtain the visa women must, "prove they were enslaved by 'force, fraud or coercion'." The visa allows former victims of sex trafficking to stay in the United States for 3 years and then apply for a green card.

There is also the particular form of sexual trafficking V-coding. This practice involves the placing of incarcerated transgender women in prison cells with violent male prisoners. In addition, prison staff sometimes coerce the V-coded "wife" into furthering their sexual role with their "husband" by offering toiletries or medical favors—e.g. giving a "wife" gloves to be used as a condom.

The Fundamentalist Church of Jesus Christ of Latter-Day Saints (FLDS) has been suspected of trafficking girls across state lines, as well as across the US–Canada and US–Mexico borders, for the purpose of sometimes involuntary plural marriage and sexual abuse. The FLDS is suspected by the Royal Canadian Mounted Police of having trafficked more than 30 under-age girls from Canada to the United States between the late 1990s and 2006 to be entered into polygamous marriages. RCMP spokesman Dan Moskaluk said of the FLDS's activities: "In essence, it's human trafficking in connection with illicit sexual activity." According to the Vancouver Sun, it's unclear whether or not Canada's anti-human trafficking statute can be effectively applied against the FLDS's pre-2005 activities, because the statute may not be able to be applied retroactively. An earlier three-year-long investigation by local authorities in British Columbia into allegations of sexual abuse, human trafficking, and forced marriages by the FLDS resulted in no charges, but did result in legislative change. Former FLDS members have also alleged that children belonging to the sect were forced to perform sexual acts as children upon older men while being unable to leave. This has been described by numerous former members as sexual slavery, and was reported as such by the Sydney Morning Herald. One former resident of Yearning for Zion, Kathleen Mackert, stated: "I was required to perform oral sex on my father when I was seven, and it escalated from there."

=== Asia ===
==== Central and West Asia ====
The Trafficking in Persons Report of 2007 from the US Department of State says that sexual slavery exists in the Persian Gulf, where women and children may be trafficked from the post-Soviet states, Eastern Europe, Far East, Africa, South Asia or other parts Middle East. There are reports of Saudi royal family members sexually abusing people.

According to media reports from late 2014 the Islamic State of Iraq and the Levant (ISIL) was selling Yazidis and Christian women as slaves. According to Haleh Esfandiari of the Woodrow Wilson International Center for Scholars, after ISIL militants have captured an area "[t]hey usually take the older women to a makeshift slave market and try to sell them." In mid-October 2014 the U.N. estimated that 5,000 to 7,000 Yazidi women and children were abducted by ISIL and sold into slavery.

In the digital magazine Dabiq, ISIL claimed religious justification for enslaving Yazidi women whom they consider to be from a heretical sect. ISIL claimed that the Yazidi are idol worshipers and their enslavement part of the old shariah practice of spoils of war. ISIL appealed to apocalyptic beliefs and "claimed justification by a Hadith that they interpret as portraying the revival of slavery as a precursor to the end of the world." In late September 2014, 126 Islamic scholars from around the Muslim world signed an open letter to the Islamic State's leader Abu Bakr al-Baghdadi, rejecting his group's interpretations of the Qur'an and hadith to justify its actions. The letter accuses the group of instigating fitna—sedition—by instituting slavery under its rule in contravention of the anti-slavery consensus of the Islamic scholarly community. In late 2014 ISIL released a pamphlet on the treatment of female slaves. In January 2015, further rules for sex slaves were announced.

Selling women and children still occurs in the Middle East. Yazidi women have also reported being raped and used as sexual slave by members of ISIS. In November 2015 it was reported that "around 2,000 women and girls are still being bought and sold in ISIS-controlled areas. The young become sex slaves and older women are beaten and used as house slaves, according to survivors and accounts from ISIS militants".

Children have been used in the Persian Gulf as camel jockies. Most children are trafficked from Africa and South Asia. This practice has ceased in most areas though.

==== South Asia ====
In 2006 the Ministry of Women and Child Development estimated that there are around 2.8 million sex workers in India, with 35 percent of them entering the trade before the age of 18 years. The number of prostitutes has also doubled in the recent decade. One news article states that an estimated 200,000 Nepalese girls have been trafficked to red light areas of India. One report estimates that every year between 5,000 and 7,000 Nepalese girls are trafficked into the red-light districts in Indian cities, and that many of the girls may only be 9 or 10 years old.

In January 2010, the Supreme Court of India stated that India is "becoming a hub" for large-scale child prostitution rackets. It suggested setting up of a special investigating agency to tackle the growing problem. An article about the Rescue Foundation in New Internationalist magazine states that "according to Save the Children India, clients now prefer 10- to 12-year-old girls". The same article attributes the rising number of prostitutes believed to have contracted HIV in India's brothels as a factor in India becoming the country with the second-largest number of people living with HIV/AIDS in the world, behind South Africa.

In Pakistan, young girls have been sold by their families to big-city brothel owners. Often this happens due to poverty or debt, whereby the family has no other way to raise the money than to sell the young girl. Cases have also been reported where wives and sisters have been sold to brothels to raise money for gambling, drinking or drug addictions. Sex slaves are reportedly also bought by 'agents' in Afghanistan who trick young girls into coming to Pakistan for well-paying jobs. Once in Pakistan they are taken to brothels (called kharabat) and forced into sexual slavery, some for many years. Beardless young boys in Afghanistan may be sold as bacha bazi for use in dancing and prostitution (pederasty), and are sometimes valued in tens of thousands of dollars.

==== East and Southeast Asia ====
In Thailand, the Health System Research Institute reported in 2005 that children in prostitution make up 40% of Thailand's prostitutes. It said that a proportion of prostitutes over the age of 18, including foreign nationals mostly from Myanmar, China's Yunnan province, Laos and Cambodia, are also in some state of forced sexual servitude. In 1996, the police in Bangkok estimated that there were at least 5,000 Russian prostitutes working in Thailand, many of whom had arrived through networks controlled by Russian gangs. The Tourism Police Bureau in 1997 stated that there were 500 Chinese and 200 European women in prostitution in Bangkok, many of whom entered Thailand illegally, often through Burma and Laos. Earlier reports, however, suggest different figures. (Police Colonel Sanit Meephan, deputy chief of Tourism Police Bureau, "Thailand popular haunt for foreign prostitutes", The Nation, 15 January 1997)

Part of the challenge in quantifying and eliminating sexual slavery in Thailand and Asia generally is the high rate of police corruption in the region. There are documented cases where Thai and other area law enforcement officials worked with human traffickers, even to the extent of returning escaped child sex slaves to brothels.

Ethnic Rohingya women are kidnapped by Myanmar military and used as sex slaves. Many Rohingya women were detained at a human trafficking syndicate transit camp in Padang Besar, Thailand, and treated like sex slaves.

=== Europe ===
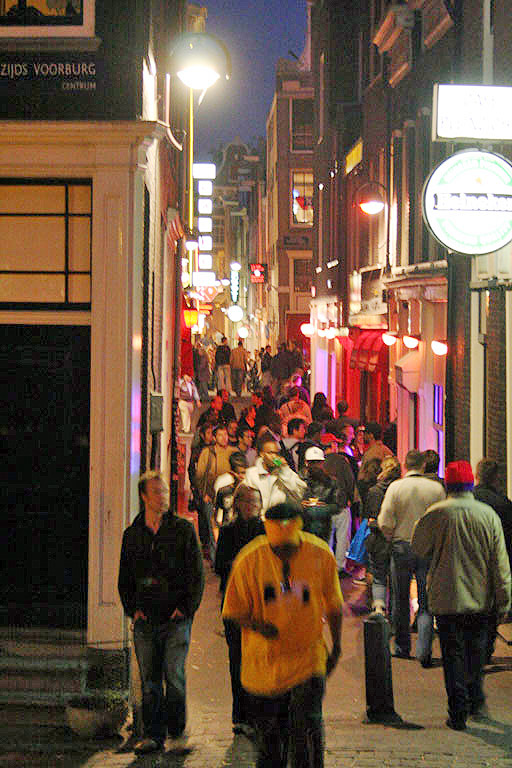
De Wallen red-light district in Amsterdam. Most of the trafficked girls and women come from eastern Europe.

In the Netherlands, the Bureau of the Dutch Rapporteur on Trafficking in Human Beings in 2005 estimated that there are from 1,000 to 7,000 trafficking victims a year. Most police investigations relate to legal sex businesses, with all sectors of prostitution being well represented, but with window brothels being particularly overrepresented. Dutch news site Expatica reported that in 2008, there were 809 registered trafficking victims in the Netherlands; out of those 763 were women and at least 60 percent of them were reportedly forced to work in the sex industry. Of reported victims, those from Hungary were all female and all forced into prostitution.

In Germany, the trafficking of women from Eastern Europe is often organized by people from that same region. German authorities identified 676 sex-trafficking victims in 2008, compared with 689 in 2007. The German Federal Police Office BKA reported in 2006 a total of 357 completed investigations of human trafficking, with 775 victims. Thirty-five percent of the suspects were Germans born in Germany and 8% were German citizens born outside Germany.

In Greece, according to NGO estimates in 2008, there may be a total 13,000–14,000 trafficking victims of all types in the country at any given time. Major countries of origin for trafficking victims brought into Greece include Nigeria, Ukraine, Russia, Bulgaria, Albania, Moldova, Romania and Belarus.

In Switzerland, the police estimated in 2006 that there may be between 1,500 and 3,000 victims of all types of human trafficking. The organizers and their victims generally come from Hungary, Slovakia, Romania, Ukraine, Moldova, Lithuania, Brazil, the Dominican Republic, Thailand and Cambodia, and, to a lesser extent, Africa.

In Belgium, in 2007, prosecutors handled a total of 418 trafficking cases, including 219 economic exploitation and 168 sexual exploitation cases. In the same year, the federal judicial police handled 196 trafficking files, compared with 184 in 2006. In 2007 the police arrested 342 persons for smuggling and trafficking-related crimes. A recent report by RiskMonitor foundation estimated that 70% of the prostitutes who work in Belgium are from Bulgaria.

In Austria, Vienna has the largest number of reported trafficking cases, although trafficking is also a problem in urban centers such as Graz, Linz, Salzburg, and Innsbruck. The NGO Lateinamerikanische Frauen in Oesterreich–Interventionsstelle fuer Betroffene des Frauenhandels (LEFOE-IBF) reported assisting 108 victims of all types of human trafficking in 2006, down from 151 in 2005.

In Spain, in 2007, officials identified 1,035 sex trafficking victims and 445 labor trafficking victims.

== See also ==
- 1921 International Convention for the Suppression of the Traffic in Women and Children
- Kippumjo - Alleged sex slaves of North Korea's ruler
- Sexual slavery recorded in the Bible

== Sources ==
- Askin, Kelly Dawn (1997). War Crimes Against Women: Prosecution in International War Crimes Tribunals. Martinus Nijhoff Publishers. ISBN 978-90-411-0486-1.
- Manthorpe, Jonathan (2008). Forbidden Nation: A History of Taiwan (illustrated ed.). Macmillan. p. 77. ISBN 978-0230614246.
- Soh, Sarah (2009). The Comfort Women: Sexual Violence and Postcolonial Memory in Korea and Japan. University of Chicago Press. ISBN 978-0226767772.
- Yoshimi, Yoshiaki (2000). Comfort women: sexual slavery in the Japanese military during World War II. Translated by O'Brien, Suzanne. Columbia University Press. ISBN 978-0231120326.
- Blussé, Leonard; Everts, Natalie, eds. (2000). The Formosan Encounter: Notes on Formosa's Aboriginal Society: A Selection of Documents from Dutch Archival Sources. Vol. II. Shung Ye Museum of Formosan Aborigines. ISBN 9579976775.
- Everts, Natalie (2000). "Jacob Lamay van Taywan: An Indigenous Formosan Who Became an Amsterdam Citizen". In Blundell, David (ed.). Austronesian Taiwan. California: University of California. ISBN 0936127090.
- Andrade, Tonio (2008b), "Chapter 2: A Scramble for Influence", How Taiwan Became Chinese: Dutch, Spanish, and Han Colonization in the Seventeenth Century, Columbia University Press
