= M. T. Randell =

American politician (1924 - 2008)

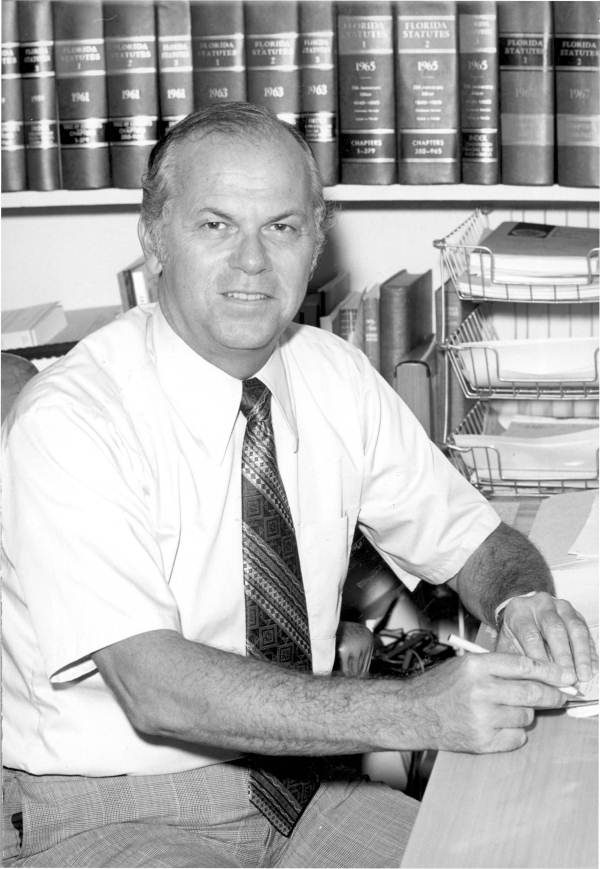
- Randell in 1972

Member of the Florida House of Representatives from Lee County
- In office 1965–1966

Member of the Florida House of Representatives from Charlotte–Collier–Glades–Hendry–Lee
- In office 1966–1967

Member of the Florida House of Representatives from the 112th district
- In office 1967–1972
- Preceded by: District established
- Succeeded by: Marshall Harris

Member of the Florida House of Representatives from the 90th district
- In office 1972–1974
- Preceded by: Maxine E. Baker
- Succeeded by: Franklin B. Mann

Personal details
- Born: November 15, 1924 Fort Myers, Florida, U.S.
- Died: February 23, 2008 (aged 83)
- Party: Democratic
- Education: University of Florida

M. T. Randell (November 15, 1924 – February 23, 2008) was an American politician. He served as a Democratic member for the 90th and 112th district of the Florida House of Representatives.

== Life and career ==
Randell was born in Fort Myers, Florida. He attended the University of Florida.

In 1965, Randell was elected to the Florida House of Representatives. In 1967, he was elected as the first representative for the newly established 112th district. He served until 1972, when he was succeeded by Marshall Harris. In the same year, he was elected to represent the 90th district, succeeding Maxine E. Baker. He served until 1974, when he was succeeded by Franklin B. Mann.

Randell died on February 23, 2008, at the age of 83.
