= Robert W. McKnight =

American politician

Robert McKnight
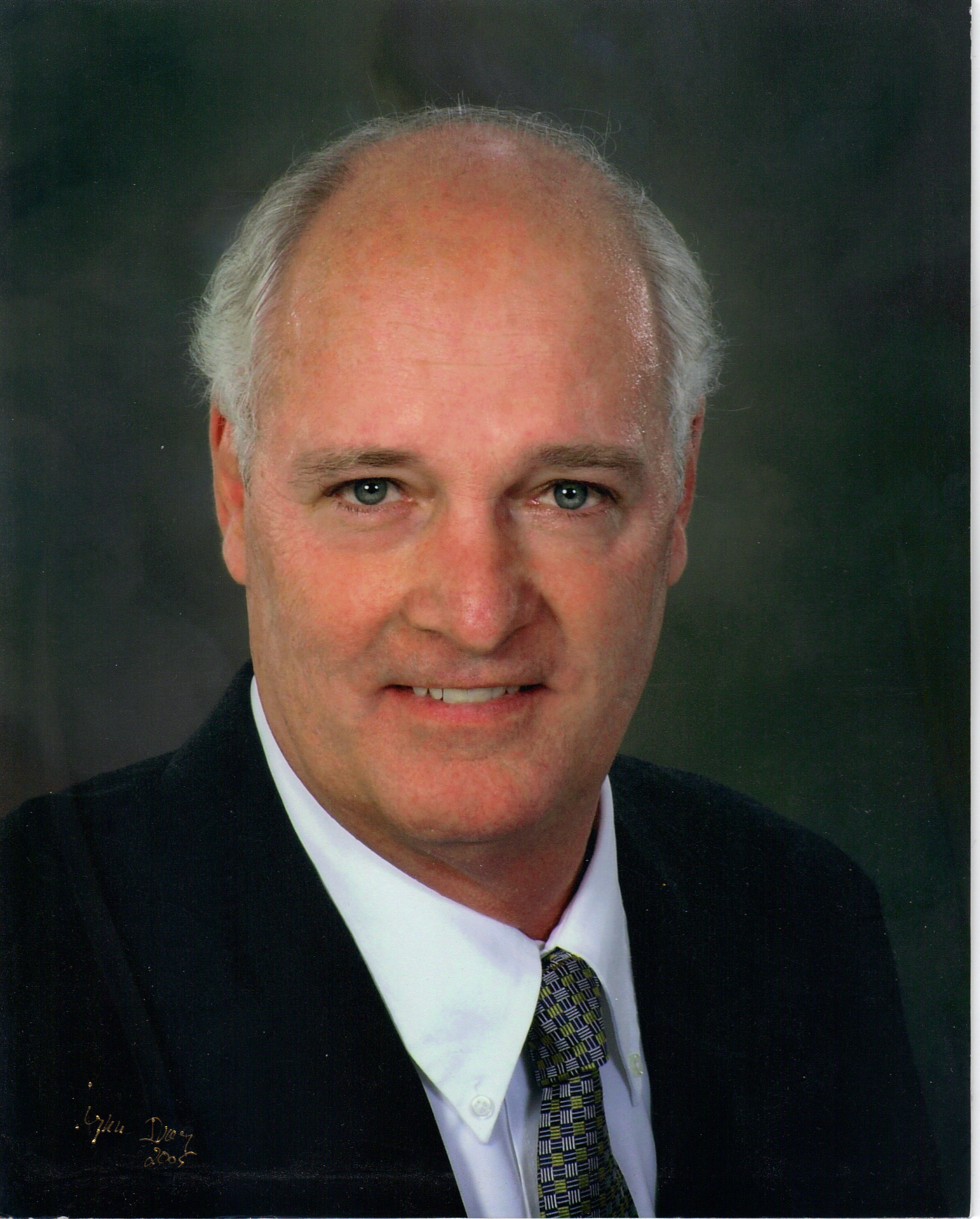

Member of the Florida Senate from the 38th district
- In office November 7, 1978 – November 2, 1982
- Preceded by: Ralph Poston
- Succeeded by: Franklin B. Mann

Member of the Florida House of Representatives from the 116th district
- In office November 5, 1974 – November 7, 1978
- Preceded by: Vernon Holloway
- Succeeded by: Gene Flinn

Personal details
- Born: May 11, 1944 (age 82) Port Chester, New York, U.S.
- Party: Democratic

Robert W. "Bob" McKnight (born May 11, 1944) is an American businessman, writer, and politician.

McKnight was born in Port Chester, New York and moved to Florida in 1948. He lived in Miami, Florida. McKnight received his bachelor's degree from Florida Southern College in 1966 and his master's degree in business administration from Florida State University in 1967. He served in the United States Army from 1968 to 1970 and was stationed in South Korea. He was involved in the real estate business with investments and management. McKnight served in the Florida House of Representatives from 1974 to 1978 and then served in the Florida Senate from 1978 to 1982. McKnight was involved with the Democratic Party. He has written books, editorial opinions, and blogs about Florida politics.
