= Franklin B. Mann =

American politician

Frank Mann
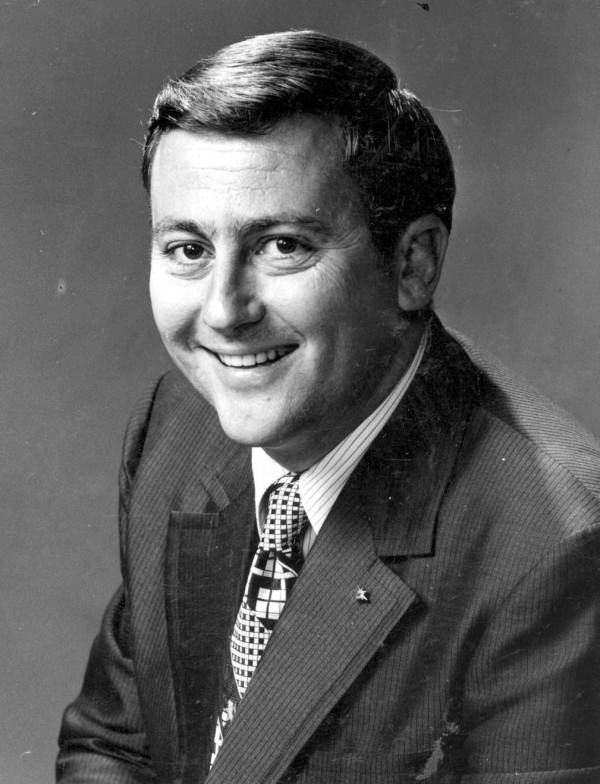

Member of the Florida Senate from the 38th district
- In office 1982–1986
- Preceded by: Robert W. McKnight
- Succeeded by: Fred Dudley

Member of the Florida House of Representatives from the 90th district
- In office 1974–1982
- Preceded by: M. T. Randell
- Succeeded by: Peter Deutsch

Personal details
- Born: August 29, 1941 Fort Myers, Florida, U.S.
- Died: June 21, 2022 (aged 80)
- Party: Republican
- Spouse: Mary Lee
- Children: 2
- Education: Vanderbilt University (BA)

Franklin B. Mann (August 29, 1941 – June 21, 2022) was an American politician in the state of Florida.

Mann was born in Fort Myers, Florida. He served in the Florida House of Representatives from 1974 to 1982 for district 90. He served in the Florida Senate from 1982 to 1986 for district 38.

He ran for Lieutenant Governor of Florida as a Democrat in 1986, as the running mate to Steve Pajcic, but was defeated. A "dark horse" candidate, Frank played on that moniker by traveling across the state riding a horse.

Mann would later serve on the Lee County Commission, representing East Lee County, where he focused on environmental issues and creating open spaces in his district. He served in that position as a Republican from 2008 to 2020.

He died on June 21, 2022, from pancreatic cancer. A former mining site in Greenbriar Swamp purchased for conservation purposes, which Commissioner Mann has been renamed the Frank Mann Preserve in his honor.

Party political offices
Preceded by Wayne Mixson	Democratic nominee for Lieutenant Governor of Florida; 1986	Succeeded by Buddy MacKay
Florida House of Representatives
Preceded by Ted Randell	Member of the Florida House of Representatives from the 90th district 1974–1982	Succeeded by Peter Deutsch
Florida Senate
Preceded by Robert W. McKnight	Member of the Florida Senate from the 38th district 1982–1986	Succeeded by Fred Dudley
