= You Belong to Me: Sex, Race and Murder in the South =

- Promotional poster
- Directed by: John Cork
- Written by: John Cork
- Produced by: Judith Hagin; Kitty Potapow; Hilary Saltzman; Lisa Van Eyssen
- Starring: Anita Davenport; Denise Durette; Reggie Brooks
- Cinematography: Marq Morrison
- Edited by: Brad Grossman
- Music by: Geoff Gallegos
- Production company: Hummingbird Film Productions
- Distributed by: Vision Films
- Release dates: October 17, 2014 (LA Femme International Film Festival); February 1, 2015 (VOD)
- Running time: 88 minutes
- Country: United States
- Language: English

You Belong to Me: Sex, Race and Murder in the South is a 2014 American documentary film produced by Hilary Saltzman, Kitty Potapow, and Jude Hagin and directed by John Cork. The film works to uncover the hidden truths of the Ruby McCollum case of 1952. McCollum, the richest African American woman in Suwannee County, Florida, shot White physician and politician Clifford Leroy Adams four times with her revolver.

Hagin discovered this story when meeting with the late Dr. James Haskins, award-winning author and English professor at The University of Florida. Haskins provided Hagin with a copy of the William Bradford Huie book Ruby McCollum: Woman in the Suwannee Jail, saying "this story needs to be told." Upon reading Huie's book, Hagin disagreed with the assertion that McCollum had been in a consensual, sexual relationship with Adams and that the Adams shooting was over a money dispute. "I could not get that into my head," she said. "I could not wrap my head around the notion that an African-American woman in 1952 would willingly have a relationship with a town's sainted physician."

Hagin's pursuit of the truth led to an exploration of "paramour rights", the assumption that White men had the right to use Black women for sex, in the Jim Crow South. While there had been previous books and documentaries on Ruby McCollum, You Belong to Me: Sex, Race and Murder in the South was the first known project to get witness accounts, including interviews with McCollum's friends and family and the last surviving juror from the trial. "I wanted to get family members on both sides to tell their side of the story," Hagin said.

The film premiered at the 2014 LA Femme International Film Festival on October 17, 2014, and was released for VOD on February 1, 2015, in time for Black History Month.

== Summary ==
On the morning of August 3, 1952, Ruby McCollum left her children in her car and walked into the "colored entrance" of Dr. Clifford Leroy Adams' office and shot him four times into his body. The White doctor and state Senator-elect died on the scene while McCollum returned home to warm milk for her baby.

Prosecutors claimed that McCollum shot Adams in a dispute over a $116 medical bill, despite the fact that she had $1,800 in her purse and was the wealthiest Black woman in town. The judge ordered the jury to disregard McCollum's testimony that Adams repeatedly raped her and that the shooting was in self-defense. In fact, Adams fathered a daughter by McCollum, but the jury was not allowed to even look at her when she was presented as evidence of the rape. McCollum was found guilty and sentenced to death. Years later, she won an insanity plea and was released from prison in 1974.

== Reception ==
The film received mostly positive response from critics. Mike Spain of Irish Film Critic gave it 4 out of 5 stars and wrote, "There is plenty to the story to keep the interest of the audience. One of the film's strengths is a lot of the story is told by people who were in Live Oak at the time or had a stake in the outcome. A juror, town's people, and Ruby's relatives. It adds to the authenticity of the documentary." In her review for Emertainment Monthly, Emily Solomon graded the film with an A− and wrote, "What is so intriguing about the way this film is put together is how the mystery unravels. The murder is established early on in the film, with new twists and turns revealed throughout that shows McCollum's motivation to commit in the first place."
