= Ruby McCollum =

American woman accused of murder

Ruby McCollum (August 31, 1909 – May 23, 1992), born Ruby Jackson was a wealthy married Black woman in Live Oak, Florida, who was charged in 1952 for first-degree murder for killing Dr. C. Leroy Adams, a White doctor and state senator–elect. She testified as to their sexual relationship and his paternity of her child. The judge prohibited her from recounting more details of her allegations of abuse by Adams. She was convicted and sentenced to death for his murder by an all-white jury.

The case was covered widely in the United States press (including a report written by Zora Neale Hurston for the Pittsburgh Courier, the first for a newspaper outside Florida), and was covered by international papers, as well. Her case was appealed and overturned on technical grounds by the state supreme court.

Before the second trial, McCollum's attorney entered an insanity plea on his client's behalf. She was examined and found mentally incompetent to stand trial, and was committed to the (Florida State Hospital) at Chattahoochee. In 1974 her attorney obtained her release under the Baker Act, as she was not considered a danger to herself or others.

In the 21st century, McCollum and her case have received renewed attention, with multiple books and four documentary films exploring the issues of race, class, sexual violence, gender, and corruption in local politics.

== Early life ==
Ruby Jackson was born in 1909 to Gertrude and William Jackson in Zuber, Florida. She was the second of their seven children and the first daughter. The children attended local segregated schools. Ruby went to a private school for Black children, Fessenden Academy. She trained to work as a teacher.

== Marriage and family ==
In 1931 Jackson married Sam McCollum. They moved to Nyack, New York, north of New York City, as part of the Great Migration of rural black people out of the South in the early 20th century. The couple had three children: Sam Jr., Sonja, and Kay. McCollum later said that her youngest child, Loretta, who was born in Live Oak, was fathered by C. Leroy Adams, a White doctor, during a forced relationship.

== Business activities ==
In 1934, the couple relocated to the area of Fort Myers, Florida. Sam's brother, Buck McCollum, had gained considerable wealth managing a bolita gambling business. Sam went into business with him and was reported to be a player in North Florida crime, including gambling and liquor sales. These were illegal in the county, but flourished because of payoffs to local law enforcement. In a related sideline, the McCollums also sold burial policies and owned a local funeral home. By the 1940s and early 1950s, the McCollums were reported to have "amassed a fortune" from their criminal and legitimate business activities.

Sam and Ruby owned a "stately, two-story home" in Live Oak, Florida, a small town of 4,000 people. They acquired it from the prior bolita operator in the county when he was run out of town. Ruby drove a new Chrysler automobile each year. The McCollums owned several "jooks" that served illegal liquor and obtained money from the juke boxes, and had a farm outside of town with the largest tobacco allotment in Florida. The McCollums also owned a farm near Lake City, where Sam stocked fields with quail for hunting with his bird dogs.

Ruby was reportedly one of the wealthiest Blacks in northern Florida. The couple was considered financially successful and well respected in the community, where they contributed liberally to their church. By 1952 their son and oldest child, Sam Jr., had started college at UCLA (University of California at Los Angeles).

== Background ==
Florida was a segregated state where Black people had been essentially disenfranchised since the turn of the century by a constitution and laws that imposed poll taxes, literacy tests, and other barriers to voter registration and Black voting. Those African Americans excluded from voters' lists could not serve on juries and they were generally excluded from any political office. Following Reconstruction, the White Democrat-dominated state legislature had passed a new constitution and laws to create legal racial segregation and Jim Crow conditions. African-Americans bore second-class status until passage in the mid-1960s of civil rights legislation.

By 1952, black men could legally serve on juries, but participation was restricted due to the barriers to voting, as noted above. In addition, attorneys could reject black jurors through challenges ostensibly other than race.

The jury in the McCollum case consisted of all white males, according to the transcript of the trial published by C. Arthur Ellis, Jr. as State of Florida vs. Ruby McCollum, Defendant.

The power structure of White men taking sexual advantage of Black women dated to the antebellum years, when African Americans were enslaved throughout the South. Into the 20th century, powerful White men would insist on what was called "paramour rights", forcing Black women into sexual relations. The assumption that powerful White men could take Black women as sexual partners, regardless of the women's desire or social status, continued to underlie 20th-century relations.

From the late 17th century, Virginia and other colonies established laws defining social status in the colonies. Under the principle of partus sequitur ventrem, they ruled that children of enslaved mothers were also born into slavery, regardless of their paternity. This was in contrast to English common law, in which the fathers of children established their social status and had financial and legal responsibility for them.

Dr. C. Leroy Adams had a reputation as a "benevolent and popular doctor who administered to the needy." According to Ruby McCollum, she was treated by him for stress when she was admitted to Brewster, a hospital for African Americans. She reportedly returned to the hospital at times that coincided with the death of Adams's son and with his election to the state senate. Before this, he had come to her house and sexually assaulted her. He continued to press her into a sexual liaison. She became pregnant and he refused to enable her to get an abortion. Their daughter Loretta was born in 1950. McCollum said she had tried repeatedly to end the relationship, but Adams refused.

In 1952 Adams was elected to the state senate. His associate, Dr. Dillard Workman, campaigned for him. Adams was considered to have a potential political future as governor.

Workman was Ruby McCollum's physician when she was pregnant with Adams's child. He performed the autopsy on Adams and testified to McCollum's sanity during her initial trial.

It was discovered years after his death, by a team researching a documentary film, that Adams had forged recommendations that supported his admission to medical school. He also later admitted that he falsified information regarding tenants at his farm in order to receive more government funding.

== Shooting of Dr. C. Leroy Adams ==
On August 3, 1952, Ruby McCollum met Dr. C. Leroy Adams, a white physician and state senator-elect, in his office in Live Oak, Florida. She had driven there with her two young children. She later admitted that she shot him four times with a revolver, and said it was because he would not agree to leave her alone. She said that over a period of years, he had repeatedly forced her to submit to sex and to bear his child. She claimed that her two-year-old daughter, Loretta, was fathered by him.

Later, researchers found that McCollum had left notes and letters that said Adams had sexually abused her, and that she was pregnant with another child by him when she killed him. She also said that Adams had taken part in her husband Sam's "illegal gambling operation." An employee at the doctor's office later described having seen the doctor accept "large deliveries of cash in examination rooms."

After Adams's murder, McCollum was arrested and taken to the state prison 50 miles away. This was temporary and for her protection, according to contemporary accounts. Given what is known, the purpose for sending her so far from her home is unknown.

The day after her arrest, her husband Sam died of a heart attack in Zuber, Florida, where he had taken their four children for safekeeping with Ruby's mother. Charles Hall, the local undertaker at the time, when interviewed in the early 21st century, said that Sam "knew his life was over" when his wife shot Adams. Hall claimed that Sam purposely overdosed on his heart medication and died after knowing his kids were safe with Ruby's mother.

== Trial ==
McCollum was defended by Frank Cannon, a District Attorney from Jacksonville, Florida. The case was prosecuted by state's attorney Keith Black, and presided over by Florida's Third Circuit Court judge, Judge Hal W. Adams. (He was not related to the doctor, but had been an honorary pallbearer at his funeral).

The all-white jury included some patients of the late Dr. Adams. Zora Neale Hurston, a black anthropologist and author, was on a free-lance assignment from the Pittsburgh Courier. She was the first person from a newspaper outside Florida to report on the trial. She was required to sit upstairs in the segregated gallery of the courtroom. Her notability and striking coverage helped McCollum's case gain a national and international audience.

In front of an all-white male jury, McCollum testified that Adams raped her in her home and in his office (located immediately across the street from the courthouse), and that he insisted that she bear his child. The court prevented her defense attorney from presenting more complete information about their relationship. All of Cannon's efforts to introduce the doctor's pattern of repeated physical abuse of her at the office were objected to by the prosecutor, and most objections were upheld by the judge. She said that Adams had struck her repeatedly the day of the murder, and they struggled. Essentially, McCollum was silenced in court regarding additional testimony that would have established mitigating circumstances.

According to Zora Neale Hurston, who reported on the trial for the Pittsburgh Courier:

Ruby was allowed to describe how, about 1948, during an extended absence of her husband, she had, in her home, succumbed to the sexual assault. She was allowed to state that her youngest child was his. Yet thirty-eight times Frank Cannon attempted to proceed from this point; thirty-eight times he attempted to create the opportunity for Ruby to tell her whole story and thus explain what were her motives; thirty-eight times the State objected; and thirty-eight times Judge Adams sustained these objections.

The judge also imposed a gag order on McCollum, preventing the press from interviewing her. Hurston wrote that defense attorney Frank Cannon, frustrated by the court's upholding the state prosecuting attorney's objections to most of the evidence he tried to introduce about McCollum's relationship with Dr. Adams, turned to the judge and said, "May God forgive you, Judge Adams, for robbing a human being of life in such a fashion."

The prosecuting attorney said that McCollum had shot Adams in anger over a disputed bill, an account supported by three witnesses during the trial. McCollum testified that she had discussed a bill with Adams that day, but maintained that she fired at the doctor in self-defense when he attacked her. The prosecution questioned this. He noted that although Adams was 100 pounds heavier than Ruby McCollum, all of her shots were fired into his back. In a much later interview, McCollum said her household always had money around, and they paid their bills promptly.

McCollum was convicted by the jury of first degree murder on December 20, 1952. She was sentenced to death in the electric chair.

Her case was appealed. During the period before the appeal was decided, McCollum was held in the Suwannee County Jail. Her conviction and death sentence were overturned on a technicality by the Florida Supreme Court on July 20, 1954. The court cited Judge Hal W. Adams, the presiding judge, for failing to be present at the jury's inspection of the scene of the crime.

== Appeal and Second Trial ==
Upon appeal of McCollum's death sentence, the Florida Supreme Court determined that Judge Adams had violated the defendant's civil rights by not allowing her to be present at the jury visit to the scene of the crime.

Concerned for her mental health following her impending second trial, defense attorney Frank Cannon arranged for McCollum to be examined in the county jail, where she had been held for about two years. At the beginning of her second trial, he entered a plea of insanity. Upon receiving the results of an examination of McCollum by court-appointed physicians, including Dr. Adams' associate Dr. Dillard Workman, the state attorney Randall Slaughter agreed to the plea. Judge Adams committed her to the Florida State Hospital for mental patients at Chattahoochee, Florida.

McCollum was institutionalized at the Florida State Hospital in Chattahoochee until 1974. That year her attorney, Frank Cannon, successfully filed for her release under Florida's recently enacted Baker Act. It allowed release of mental patients who were not judged to be a threat to themselves or the community.

== Coverage ==
There was extensive coverage of the trial, but the judge put McCollum under a gag order. The press was never allowed to interview McCollum.

Ellis suggests that this isolation of McCollum from the press was done less to cover up the affair between McCollum and Adams, which was already making the gossip circuits, than it was to conceal the illegal dealings between whites and blacks in the community related to gambling and liquor. The IRS was in town to collect taxes on unreported gambling and liquor sales. Ellis writes that this attempt to silence McCollum proved in the long run to be totally unsuccessful.

The noted African-American writer Zora Neale Hurston covered the trial as a free lance reporter for the Pittsburgh Courier from the fall of 1952 through Ruby McCollum's conviction just before Christmas that year. She was forced to sit in the segregated second-floor gallery of the courtroom. From January–March 1953, the Courier published Hurston's series entitled, The Life Story of Ruby McCollum.

Hurston, who was unable to attend the appeal or the second trial for financial reasons, contacted journalist William Bradford Huie to interest him in the case. They had worked together before and he had taken on controversial cases. She shared her notes from the first trial and corresponded with him to furnish additional information. She also asked for bus fare to attend the trial, but Huie did not respond.

Huie did investigate the story and, after attending the appeal and second trial, published Ruby McCollum: Woman in the Suwannee Jail (1956). This book became a bestseller. Huie asked his publisher not to distribute the book in Florida due to his continuing legal troubles there. Huie's book also addresses his effort to fight Judge Adams' gag order against the press. He filed a First Amendment challenge, claiming freedom of the press to speak to the defendant, but did not succeed in his suit.

At one point, Judge Adams charged Huie with contempt of court for attempting to influence Dr. Fernay, a witness scheduled to testify as to McCollum's sanity. The journalist served overnight in jail as a result of not paying a fine the judge had imposed in the contempt charge. During that period, Huie met the director, Elia Kazan. In 1960 they had discussions about Kazan's directing a film to be adapted from Huie's book and entitled The Ruby McCollum Story. While other films based on Huie's books were produced in the 1960s and later, none was made from his account of the Ruby McCollum story.

Huie says in his updated, fourth edition of his work (1964) that he was denied entrance to the Florida State Mental Hospital in Chattahoochee, Florida where Ruby McCollum was held. Jet Magazine reporters visited Ruby McCollum there in 1958 and published their interview with her. Huie never interviewed McCollum.

== Later years and death ==
In 1974, attorney Frank Cannon, who was her primary attorney during her murder trial in 1952, visited McCollum in the mental hospital. Without asking for any legal fees, he filed legal papers to have her released under the Baker Act. This allowed mental patients who were considered not to be a danger to be released to their families.

McCollum lived after her release in a rest home in Silver Springs, Florida, funded by a trust set up by author William Bradford Huie. He had paid her $40,000 for the movie rights for a feature film. He hoped to have one developed from his book about the case Ruby McCollum: Woman in the Suwannee Jail (1964, 4th edition), but this never occurred.

McCollum was able to see her children again. Sam Jr. had been convicted in 1975 in federal court on 10 counts of gambling. He had been living in the McCollum homestead, from which the FBI confiscated $250,000. They later returned a good portion of it to him, after the IRS deducted appropriate taxes and penalties. He is not known to have shared any with his mother.

McCollum's daughters Sonja and Kay had both trained as teachers, like their mother. They both married and lived in Ocala, Florida. Kay (McCollum) Hope died in a car accident in 1978. Sonja (McCollum) Wood died of a heart attack in 1979.

In November 1980, Al Lee of the Ocala Star Banner interviewed McCollum at the rest home in Silver Springs. Lee wrote that McCollum had no memory of her ordeal. He reported that psychiatrists said that she may have suffered Ganser syndrome, or the suppression of painful memories. In those years, the State Mental Hospital at Chattahoochee was investigated more than once over issues of patient treatment, overuse of medications including thorazine, and the administration of electroshock therapy, which can affect memory.]

After being released from prison, Sam Jr. returned to live in the family home in Live Oak. He died in 2014. Loretta McCollum had left Florida and lived in New Jersey.

On May 23, 1992, at 4:45 AM, McCollum died of a stroke at the New Horizon Rehabilitation Center, at the age of 82. Her brother, Matt Jackson, had died less than a year before. The family arranged for her to be buried beside her brother and his wife in the cemetery behind Hopewell Baptist Church in Live Oak. Her name was mistakenly spelled on her death certificate as "Ruby McCollumn".

== Aftermath ==
The case has haunted people, in part because of Judge Adams's gag order. Some commentators said the silences were to keep quiet the fact that there had been white participation in Sam McCollum's illegal bolita operations, a source of untaxed money to help finance the participants’ businesses in town.

As Judge Adams upheld prosecutor's objections during the trial, the defense attorney Cannon was prevented from introducing most of the evidence related to Adams' sexual abuse of McCollum. She was allowed, however, to testify to being forced to have Adams's baby.

This was the first time that a black woman had testified to a white man's paternity of her child and other circumstances of her defense. This established the trial as a landmark case, since no other black woman who had shot and killed a white man had ever been allowed to testify in her own defense.

== Representation in other media ==
- In 1999, Thulani Davis wrote a play, Everybody's Ruby: Story of a Murder in Florida, which premiered in New York at the Joseph Papp Public Theatre, directed by Kenny Leon. It starred Viola Davis as McCollum and Phylicia Rashad as author Zora Neale Hurston. The play is described as vividly acted, building on imagined connections between McCollum and Hurston.
- In 2010, "The Ballad of Ruby McCollum", a song performed by Peg and Chip Carbone, written by Peg and Chip Carbone and David Schmeling, was recorded at Reveal Audio - Atlanta.
- The Other Side of Silence is a 2012 documentary film about McCollum and her case by Dr. Claudia Hunter Johnson, a writer and teacher. (She was nominated for a 1995 Pulitzer Prize for her memoir, Stifled Laughter.) She describes McCollum as being "wrongfully convicted of first-degree murder—the first woman sentenced to Florida's electric chair. She was framed by the corrupt white power structure for the murder of her abusive white doctor, State Senator-elect, Dr. Clifford LeRoy Adams Jr.") The film contains an interview with A. K. Black, the prosecutor in the McCollum case. Johnson reported receiving a death threat while working on the film. The film was the official nominee at several film festivals in 2012.
- Curtain of Secrecy: The Story of Ruby McCollum (documentary) (2014), a feature-length documentary about Ruby McCollum, premiered in Jacksonville, Florida. It is directed by Ramona Ramdeen and produced by the Art Institute of that city. She included an interview with Dr. C. Arthur Ellis, Jr., a historian who was a local child at the time of the murder and has extensively researched the case.
- In November 2014, '"The Shot Doctor", an episode in the A Crime to Remember series airing on Investigation Discovery, included historian, Dr. C. Arthur Ellis, Jr. The narrator mistakenly said that McCollum was not allowed to testify at her trial. Ellis correctly noted that she was allowed to give limited testimony. The judge upheld 38 objections by the prosecutor to additional testimony.
- You Belong to Me: Sex, Race and Murder in the South (2015), a feature-length documentary about Ruby McCollum and her case, was released on video on demand and DVD, in conjunction with Black History Month and Women's History Month. It was written and directed by John Cork. The film was produced by Hilary Saltzman, Kitty Potapow, and Jude Hagin (former state film commissioner) through Hummingbird Film Productions, LLC. It was the first film for which members of the McCollum and Adams families spoke on the record about the case. The last surviving juror from the trial and others involved in case also participated in the film.
- A sung-through musical about Ruby McCollum called "Ruby," directed and co-written by Nate Jacobs, was produced by the Westcoast Black Theatre Troupe in 2024, and presented again at Detroit's Music Hall Center for the Performing Arts in 2025. It covers McCollum's courtship by husband Sam, move to Live Oak, the murder of Adams, and the courtroom trials. Zora Neale Hurston is a character and the story is told in part through her reporting.

== See also ==
- Celia (slave)
- Lena Baker
- Joan Little

== Bibliography ==
- Diaz, John A. "Woman Chased by Mob After Slaying Doctor: Murder of White Medico Touches Off Powder Keg." (Pittsburgh Courier, August 16, 1952)
- Huie, William Bradford, Ruby McCollum: Woman in the Suwannee Jail (New York: E. P. Dutton, 1956). 2nd Edition (title change only): The Crime of Ruby McCollum. (London: Jarrolds Publishers, 1957). 3rd Edition: The Crime of Ruby McCollum. (London: Grey Arrow, 1959). Fourth Edition (revised and updated): Ruby McCollum: Woman in the Suwannee Jail. (New York: Signet Books, 1964).
- Hurston, Zora Neale. Series of articles covering the trial: Pittsburgh Courier, October 1952-January 1953. Also, "The Life Story Of Ruby McCollum", Pittsburgh Courier, Jan-March 1953.

=== Fiction ===
- Davis, Thulani. Everybody's Ruby (Samuel French, Inc., 2000, 79 pages), drama play, ISBN 0-573-62712-6.
- Ellis, C. Arthur (Jr.). Zora Hurston And The Strange Case Of Ruby McCollum, historical novel based upon events. (Chattanooga, TN: Gadfly Publishing, 2009). ISBN 978-0-9820940-0-6.(self-published)

== Books ==
In his annotated edition of the trial transcript, Ellis explores the intertwining of personal and professional relationships among the figures prominent in the case and the trial. He noted that late 20th and early 21st-century professional standards related to conflict of interest would likely classify certain figures as having violated those standards. As an example, he notes that Dr. Dillard Workman was Adams' medical associate. Workman treated McCollum for her prenatal care of her child by Adams. Workman had campaigned for Adams in his state senatorial race. He was commissioned to conduct Adams' autopsy and testified about it during the murder trial of his patient, McCollum, the defendant. In addition, at the second trial of McCollum, he testified as an expert witness as to her sanity. He would likely be considered today to be violating his obligation to her as his patient in these actions. In addition, the judge who presided over the trial was a pallbearer at Dr. Adams' funeral.

- Tammy Evans wrote The Silencing of Ruby McCollum: Race, Class, and Gender in the South (2006), Foreword by Jacqueline Jones Royster, University Press of Florida. Reviewer Elizabeth Boyd writes, "The starkness of the crime was matched only by the evasiveness that characterized its aftermath, and it is this prevarication--this collective dissembling on the part of Live Oak folk, white and black--that is the true subject of the book." Evans focused on the silencing of Ruby McCollum by the court, which placed a gag order on her and prohibited her from speaking to the press. Evans said this freed whites to create a "cover story."
