= Maxine Baker (politician) =

American politician (1898–1994)

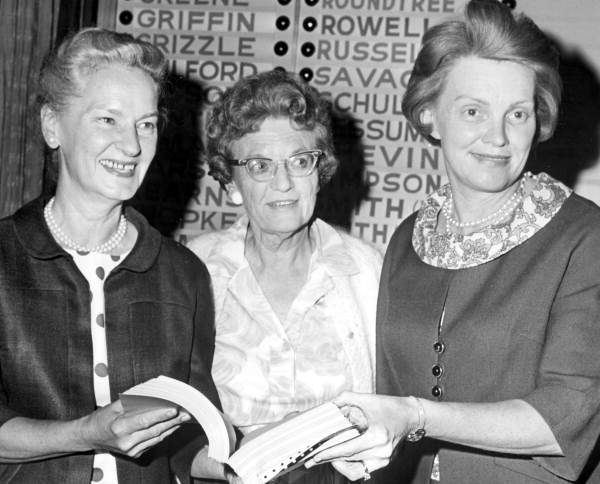
- Maxine Baker (center) in 1965.
- Born: Maxine R. Eldridge; July 26, 1898; Berwyn, Maryland, U.S.
- Died: January 28, 1994 (aged 95); Orange City, Florida, U.S.
- Education: Radcliffe College
- Occupation: Politician
- Political party: Democratic Party
- Spouse: John A. Baker

Maxine Baker (July 26, 1898 – January 28, 1994) was an American politician. She served as a Democratic member of the Florida House of Representatives from 1963 to 1972, representing Miami-Dade County, Florida. She is the namesake of the Baker Act, also known as the Florida Mental Health Act.

Baker was on Florida Governor LeRoy Collins's Special Constitutional Advisory Committee (SPAC) in 1958 as a prominent Dade County representative of the League of Women Voters. Many in Florida wanted to finally revise the old Florida Constitution of 1885. She was a progressive force in advocating for county home rule, reapportionment, and particularly for desegregation of public schools. These changes eventually were incorporated into the 1968 revised Florida Constitution.
