= Baker Act =

Involuntary institutionalization law

Florida State Legislature
- Full name: Florida Mental Health Act of 1971
- Introduced: 1971
- Sponsor(s): Maxine Baker
- Governor: Reubin O'Donovan Askew
- Bill: HB 665 (1971)
- Website: leg.state.fl.us

Status: Current legislation

The Baker Act, officially known as the Florida Mental Health Act of 1971, is a law in the U.S. state of Florida that allows doctors, mental health practitioners, judges, and law enforcement officers to detain and involuntarily commit individuals to a mental health facility for up to 72 hours. This action can be taken if there is evidence of violent or suicidal behavior associated with a severe mental health condition or if the individual is at significant risk of harm due to an inability to care for themselves. The act requires that the person be deemed unwilling or unable to voluntarily seek evaluation on their own.

The Baker Act aims to provide a period to assess the individual’s mental health and address any immediate crisis. During this time, an evaluation will determine if the person has a mental health condition and whether they pose a threat to themselves or others. If they are deemed to be no longer a risk, they are typically released after the 72-hour period. The Baker Act also establishes procedures and rules for inpatient voluntary and involuntary admission for assessment and treatment of mental illness, and involuntary outpatient treatment for mental illness.

Named after Maxine Baker, a former Florida state representative, the act aims to protect the rights of individuals with mental health challenges by limiting involuntary commitment to those who pose a danger to themselves or others. Its implementation has been the subject of significant controversy and debate due to its impact and potential consequences. The nickname has led to the term "to Baker Act" being used as a transitive verb to describe the act of referring someone for involuntary commitment, and "Baker acted" being used as a passive-voice verb to describe the condition of a person who has been detained in this manner.

== History ==
The 1971 legislation was nicknamed the "Baker Act" after state representative Maxine Baker (D–Miami), who served from 1963 to 1972. She was strongly interested in mental health issues, served as chair of the House Committee on Mental Health, and sponsored the bill. Every state has a mental health statute, with many similar to the Baker Act, but also differences across states in short-term emergency commitment (the equivalent of an involuntary [Baker Act] examination in Florida), long-term involuntary commitment (the equivalent of involuntary inpatient placement in Florida), and involuntary outpatient commitment (the equivalent of involuntary outpatient services in Florida).

In June 2024, the Florida government amended the Baker Act to grant law enforcement officers the discretion to decline to detain individuals showing signs of serious mental illness, instead of requiring detention by default. Previously, the law mandated that police detain individuals exhibiting symptoms of serious mental illness if there was a threat of harm, regardless of other circumstances. The amendment now gives officers more flexibility to assess whether detention is necessary. The Baker Act had already granted judges and mental health professionals the discretion to decline involuntary commitment if they determined it was not warranted. The amendment specifies that the 72-hour examination period begins immediately upon entry into the receiving facility.

== Short-term inpatient voluntary and involuntary examination ==
While much of the focus of the Baker Act is on the involuntary nature of activities allowed, the Baker Act also addresses voluntary aspects of examination and treatment. The word "voluntary" appears 53 times in the Baker Act, while the word "involuntary" appears 224 times. The Baker Act addresses "voluntary admission" (F.S. 394.4625), including the authority to receive patients, discharge of voluntary patients, notice of right to discharge, and transfer to voluntary status from an involuntary status. Websites for Florida Judicial Circuits and Clerks of Court contain information about the Baker Act examination process, including how to pursue an ex-parte order.

The Baker Act allows for involuntary examination, which can be initiated by an ex-parte order of a judge, law enforcement officials, or certain health professionals. These health professionals include physicians, clinical psychologists, nurses with certain types of training (psychiatric nurse, APRN), clinical social workers, mental health counselors, and marriage and family therapists. Although not specified in the Baker Act as a professional type that can initiate involuntary examinations, Physicians' Assistants are allowed to initiate involuntary examinations as per a 2008 Florida Attorney General opinion.

Forms for law enforcement and health professionals to initiate involuntary examinations and templates for petitions and orders for ex-parte orders for involuntary examinations are available on the Department of Children and Families website. The Florida Judicial Circuits provide information about how to pursue an ex-parte order for involuntary examination.

Examinations may last up to 72 hours after a person is deemed medically stable and occur in over 100+ Florida Department of Children and Families-designated receiving facilities statewide. A "receiving facility" is defined in the Baker Act as "a public or private facility or hospital designated by the department to receive and hold or refer, as appropriate, involuntary patients under emergency conditions for mental health or substance abuse evaluation and to provide treatment or transportation to the appropriate service provider. The term does not include a county jail." Note that what some colloquially call "state hospitals" and what the Baker Act calls "treatment facilities" are not receiving facilities, and people are not involuntary examined at these "treatment facilities." Additional details about treatment facilities are included in the Involuntary Inpatient Placement section of this page.

Specific criteria must be met in order to initiate involuntary examination. Among those criteria are the following elements, which do not individually qualify an individual as meeting the criteria. To initiate an involuntary examination, the Baker Act requires that there is reason to believe the individual:

- has a mental illness as defined in section 394.455, Florida Statutes and
- is refusing voluntary examination after conscientious explanation and disclosure of the purpose of the examination OR is unable to determine for himself/herself whether the examination is necessary AND
- without care or treatment, said individual is likely to suffer from neglect or refuse to care for himself/herself, and such neglect or refusal poses a real and present threat or substantial harm to his/her well-being and it is not apparent that such harm may be avoided through the help of willing family members or friends or the provision of other services OR there is substantial likelihood that without care or treatment the individual will cause serious bodily harm to self and/or others in the near future, as evidenced by recent behavior. Note that the language in the bullets above is taken directly from the Baker Act.

The decisive criterion, as stated in the statute, mentions a substantial likelihood that without care or treatment, the person will cause serious bodily harm in the near future. Criteria are not met simply because a person has a mental illness, appears to have mental problems, takes psychiatric medication, has an emotional outburst, or refuses voluntary examination. If there are family members or friends willing to help prevent any potential and present threat of substantial harm, the criteria for involuntary examination are also not met. A June 2024 amendment specified that the family members or friends must also be able and responsible to provide the necessary assistance in order for the exemption to apply.

The following may not be used as a basis to initiate an involuntary examination:

- Developmental disability
- Intoxication
- Conditions manifested only by antisocial behavior
- Conditions manifested only by substance abuse impairment

"Substantial likelihood" must involve evidence of recent behavior to justify the substantial likelihood of serious bodily harm in the near future. Moments in the past when an individual may have considered harming themselves or another do not qualify the individual as meeting the criteria.

Under the Baker Act, individuals who are involuntarily detained generally have the right to communicate privately with people outside the facility. However, this right may be restricted if the facility determines that such communication could be harmful to the individual or others. Facilities must provide immediate access to a patient’s family members, guardian, guardian advocate, representative, attorney, or a Florida advocacy council, unless such access is determined to be detrimental to the patient or the patient chooses to refuse communication.

If restrictions are placed on a patient’s communication or visitation, the facility must issue a written notice explaining the restriction to the patient, their attorney, and their designated guardian or representative. A qualified professional must document the restriction within 24 hours, and it must be recorded in the patient’s clinical file. Any imposed communication restrictions must be reviewed by the facility at least once every three days. If a minor is being detained under the Baker Act and their parents are present at the time of detention, law enforcement officers are required to notify the parents of the location where the child will be transported prior to moving them to the facility.

There are many possible outcomes following the involuntary examination of the individual. These include the release of the individual to the community (or other community placement), a petition for involuntary inpatient placement (often called civil commitment), a petition for involuntary outpatient placement (what some call outpatient commitment or assisted outpatient treatment), or voluntary treatment (if the person is competent to consent to voluntary treatment and consents to voluntary treatment, such as specified in case law). The involuntary outpatient placement language in the Baker Act took effect as part of the Baker Act reform in 2004.

== Inpatient involuntary placement ==
People may be placed involuntarily at an inpatient facility. The main section of the Baker Act about involuntary inpatient placement (F.S. 394.467) specifies the criteria for involuntary inpatient placement, as well as the petitioning process, the appointment of counsel, the continuance of the hearing, and the hearing. Note that people may be involuntarily placed for up to 90 days, except that the involuntary placement may be up to 6 months in a treatment facility. The "treatment facilities" at which people may be admitted for involuntary inpatient placement are Florida State Hospital (in Chattahoochee), Northeast Florida State Hospital (in MacClenny), and South Florida State Hospital (in Pembroke Pines). While children may be involuntarily placed at an inpatient facility, children may not be involuntarily placed at state treatment facilities.

== Involuntary outpatient services ==
The Baker Act has allowed for involuntary outpatient services. The criteria for involuntary outpatient services, as well as specifics about petitioning, the appointment of counsel, the continuance of hearings, and hearings, are specified in the Baker Act. Other phrases used historically or currently on a local or national level to describe this legal mechanism are involuntary outpatient commitment and assisted outpatient treatment or AOT. Note that while the phrase "involuntary outpatient services" is used in the Baker Act, the prior phrase that was used in the Baker Act to describe this legal mechanism, "involuntary outpatient placement," still appears on some forms and in the relevant Florida Administrative Code (65E-5.285).

== Resources, training and regulations ==
The Florida Department of Children and Families makes resources available online for individuals and families to learn about the Baker Act and to access training about it. There was a 2023 Baker Act User Reference Guide published in the fall of 2023. Reports of data about involuntary examination are available at the Baker Act Reporting Center. Additional specifics about requirements for and carrying out the Baker Act are contained in Florida Administrative Code 65E-5, titled the "Mental Health Act Regulation," which some colloquially refer to as the "rule." Mandatory and suggested forms to use for various activities, as allowed in the Baker Act, are part of a subsection of this Florida Administrative Code, 65E-5.120.

== Reception ==
An editorial in the Tampa Bay Times wrote "that crisis stabilization is a Band-Aid solution to emotional problems," and the Act should be reformed to allow public defenders to have access to the patient's medical records and ongoing counseling and outpatient mental health treatment should be provided to the patient.

A 1999 report by the Florida Supreme Court Commission on Fairness noted that the involuntary placement process is susceptible to abuse for financial gain or the convenience of nursing homes, assisted living facilities, mental health facilities, and mental health professionals.

In May 2022, a federal jury ruled that a Miami-Dade Public Schools police officer had violated the civil rights of Susan Khoury, a Miami-Dade County resident, by unlawfully committing her for involuntary psychiatric evaluation without a reasonable basis to believe she posed an imminent threat to herself or others. At the time, Khoury had been legally video recording the officer in public—an activity protected under the First Amendment—when he ordered her to stop and took her into custody. Khoury later sued the officer under 42 U.S.C. § 1983 and was awarded $520,000 in damages.

In December 2024, the Southern Poverty Law Center and Florida Health Justice Project filed a lawsuit on behalf of Disability Rights Florida, alleging that the Florida Department of Children and Families had failed to comply with state law requiring the tracking of Baker Act use. The lawsuit claims this failure impedes efforts to evaluate the law's impact on vulnerable populations and undermines transparency and accountability in its enforcement.

== See also ==
- 5150 (involuntary psychiatric hold), a section of the California Welfare and Institutions Code
- Laura's Law
- Kendra's Law
- Marchman Act
