= War Crimes Against Women =

1997 nonfiction book by Kelly Dawn Askin

War Crimes Against Women: Prosecution in International War Crimes Tribunals
- Author: Kelly Dawn Askin
- Publisher: Martinus Nijhoff Publishers
- Publication date: 1997
- ISBN: 978-90-411-0486-1
- OCLC: 37418389

War Crimes Against Women: Prosecution in International War Crimes Tribunals is a non-fiction book by Kelly Dawn Askin. It was published in 1997 by Martinus Nijhoff Publishers. It describes the history of war crimes, including war rape, perpetrated against women. It focuses on the events of twentieth century such as the Nuremberg trials, Tokyo War Crimes tribunals, and the then-ongoing Yugoslav Wars.
