= Mount Lebanon Mutasarrifate =

Subdivision of the Ottoman Empire

Mount Lebanon Mutasarrifate مُتَصَرِّفِيَّة جَبَل لُبْنَان
- Mutasarrifate of the Ottoman Empire
- 9 June 1861–September 1918
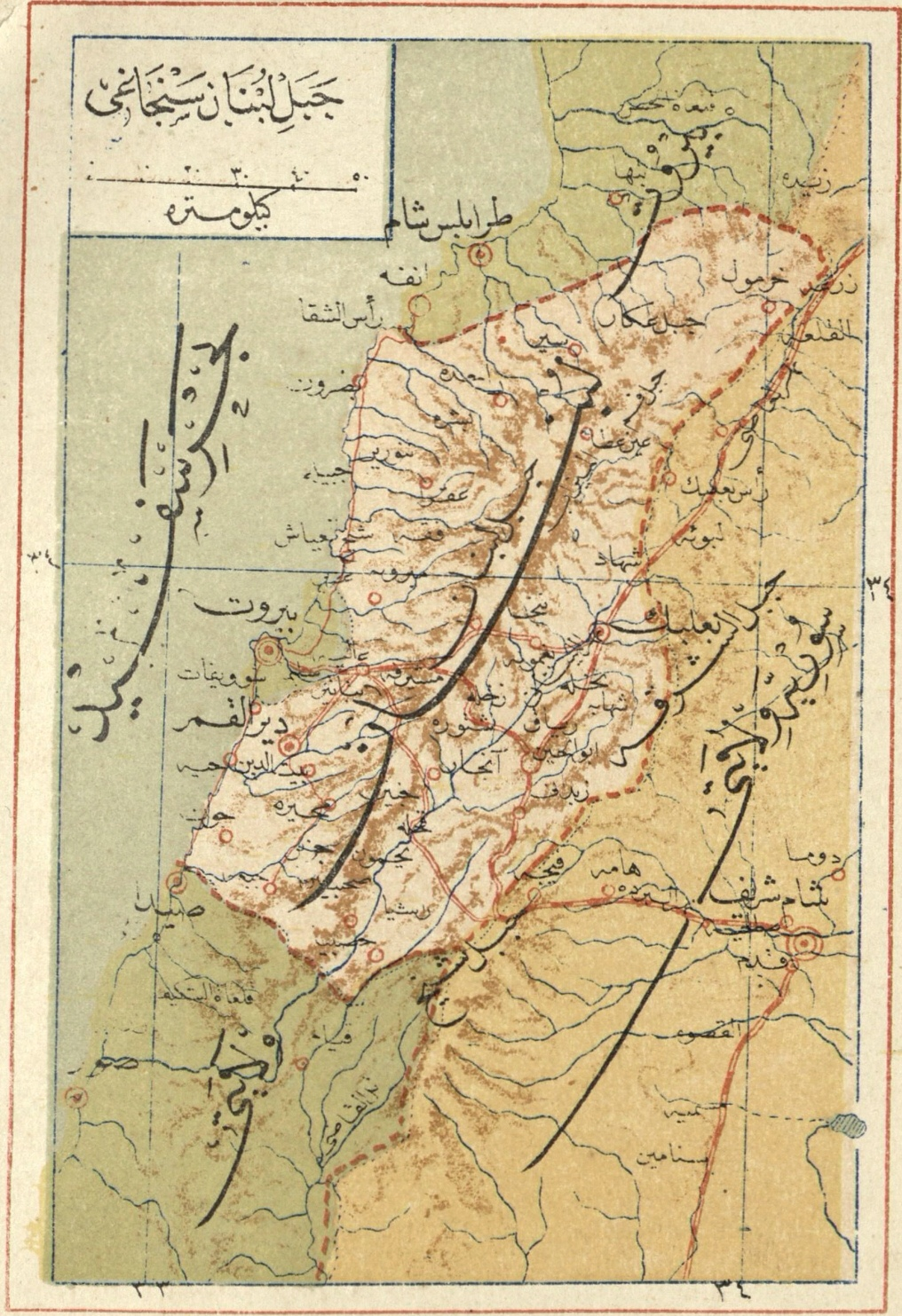
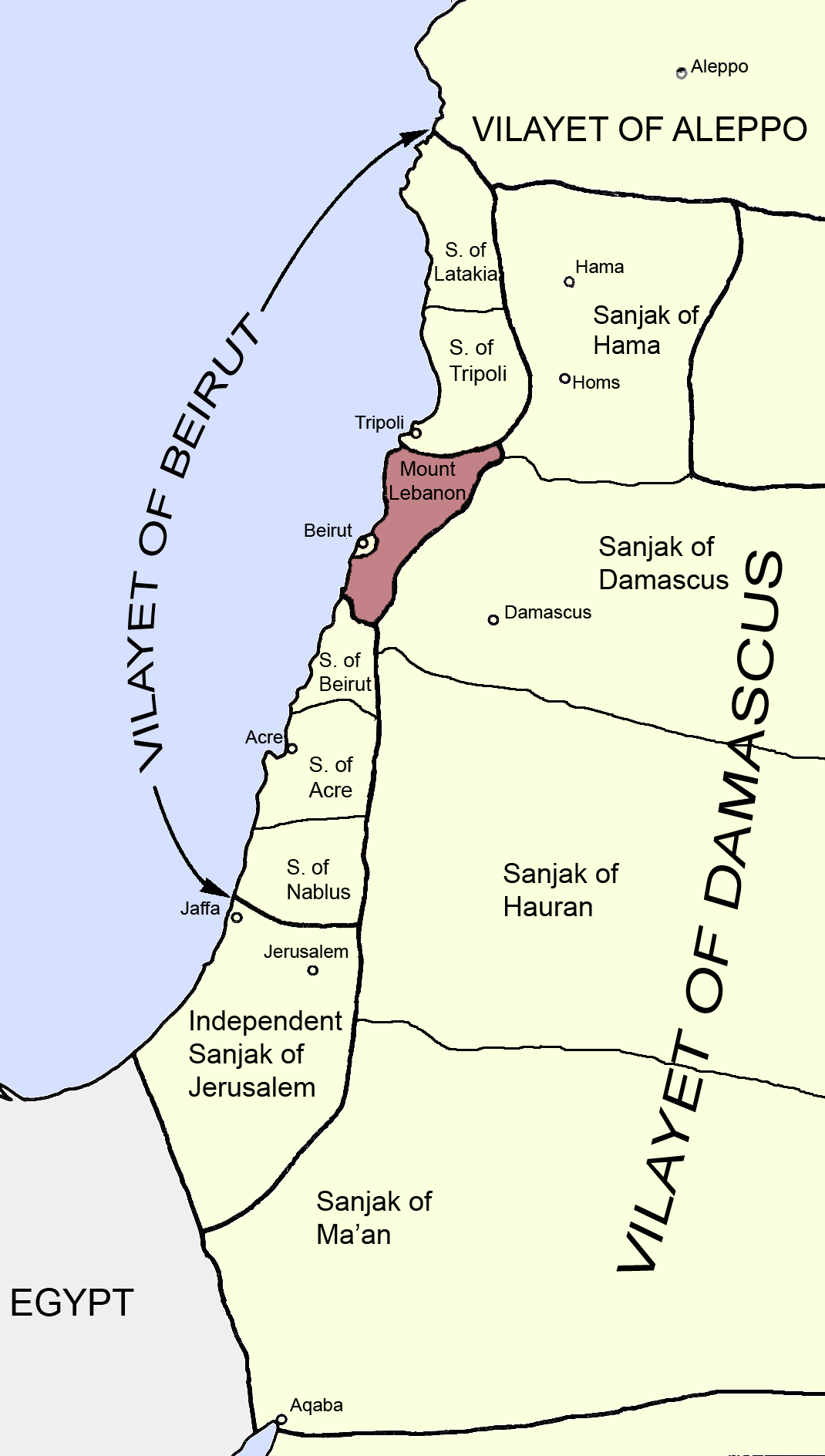
- Capital: Deir el Qamar
- Demonym: أَهْل الْجَبَل; "Ahl al-Jabal", lit. 'People of the Mountain'
- Population
  - 1870: 110,000
  - 1895: 399,530
  - 1913: 414,747
  - 1918: 200,000
- Historical era: 19th–20th century
  - Règlement Organique: 3 August 1860 9 June 1861
  - Ottoman occupation: 1915 September 1918
Preceded by
Tripoli Eyalet
Double Qaim-Maqamate of Mount Lebanon
Sidon Eyalet
Succeeded by
Occupied Enemy Territory Administration
- Today part of: Lebanon

The Mount Lebanon Mutasarrifate (1861–1918, Arabic: مُتَصَرِّفِيَّة جَبَل لُبْنَان, romanized: Mutaṣarrifiyyat Jabal Lubnān; Ottoman Turkish: جَبَلِ لُبْنَان مُتَصَرِّفلِيغى, romanized: Cebel-i Lübnan Mutasarrıflığı) (Note: Also known as the Mount Lebanon Sanjak; Ottoman Turkish: جَبَلِ لُبْنَان سَنْجَاغى, romanized: Cebel-i Lübnan Sancağı, Arabic: سَنْجَق جَبَل لُبْنَان, romanized: Sanjaq Jabal Lubnān) was one of the Ottoman Empire's subdivisions following the 19th-century Tanzimat reform. After 1861, there existed an autonomous Mount Lebanon with a Christian Mutasarrif (governor), which had been created as a homeland for the Maronites under European diplomatic pressure following the 1860 Druze–Maronite conflict. The arrangement formalized confessional representation in local administration and is often discussed as a key moment in the institutionalization of sectarian governance in Mount Lebanon. The Maronite Catholics and the Druze founded modern Lebanon in the early eighteenth century, through the ruling and social system known as the "Maronite-Druze dualism" in Mount Lebanon. The Mutasarrifate era marked a shift in which confessional representation became the primary framework for political administration in Mount Lebanon.

This system came during the era of Tanzimat reforms initiated by Sultan Abdulmejid I in an attempt to extricate the Ottoman State from its internal problems, and it was approved after the major sectarian strife of 1860 and the numerous massacres that occurred in Mount Lebanon, Damascus, the Beqaa Valley and Jabal Amil among Muslims and Christians in general, and the Druze and Maronites in particular; European powers intervened diplomatically after the 1860 violence and pressured the Ottoman government during negotiations over the province’s administrative structure. The Mutasarrifate era is characterized by the spread of national consciousness, science and culture among the Lebanese, for many reasons, including: the spread of schools in numerous villages, towns and cities, and the opening of two large universities that are still among the oldest and most prestigious universities in the Middle East: the Syrian Evangelical College, which became the American University of Beirut, and Saint Joseph University.

The Mutasarrifate era is also characterized by the beginning of Lebanese emigration to Egypt, Western European countries, North America, and South America, where a number of immigrants achieved great success that wasn't possible to achieve in their homeland. Additionally, many of these immigrants contributed to the revival of the Arabic language and Arabic literature after years of stagnation; this revival lasted for many years, and contributed to raising the Arab national spirit and political awareness in the period of Al-Nahda among Arabs, both in Lebanon, in neighboring countries, and across the globe. The autonomy of Mount Lebanon (Mutasarrifate) ended with the Ottoman occupation at the beginning of World War I. The defeat of the Ottoman Empire led to a French military invasion in 1918, initiating the French Mandate.

== Background ==
=== Mount Lebanon as an emirate ===
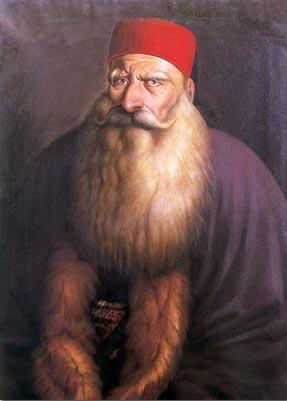
Painting of the Emir of Mount Lebanon Bashir II

Prince Bashir Shihab II had been ruling as the Emir of Lebanon since 1788, and he consolidated his authority over the country by eliminating his rivals from the feudal lords. In 1832, Ibrahim Pasha's Egyptian army entered the Levant and expelled Ottoman forces. Bashir II, having previously allied with Egypt's ruler Muhammad Ali Pasha, provided military support to the Egyptian campaign. In return for this assistance, Ibrahim Pasha, the commander of the Egyptian army, restored Bashir's full authority over the Emirate.

Bashir used this autonomy to eliminate remaining feudal rivals, confiscating their estates and appointing his own relatives to replace them. Ibrahim Pasha implemented social reforms that elevated the status of Christians, appointing them to key administrative positions within the new government. Concurrently, he ordered the confiscation of weapons from the feudal lords to diminish their military power. As the majority of these feudal lords were Druze, and the Druze constituted a smaller population compared to Christians, they perceived the Egyptian policies as discriminatory. The combination of reduced political influence and disarmament created resentment among the Druze population.

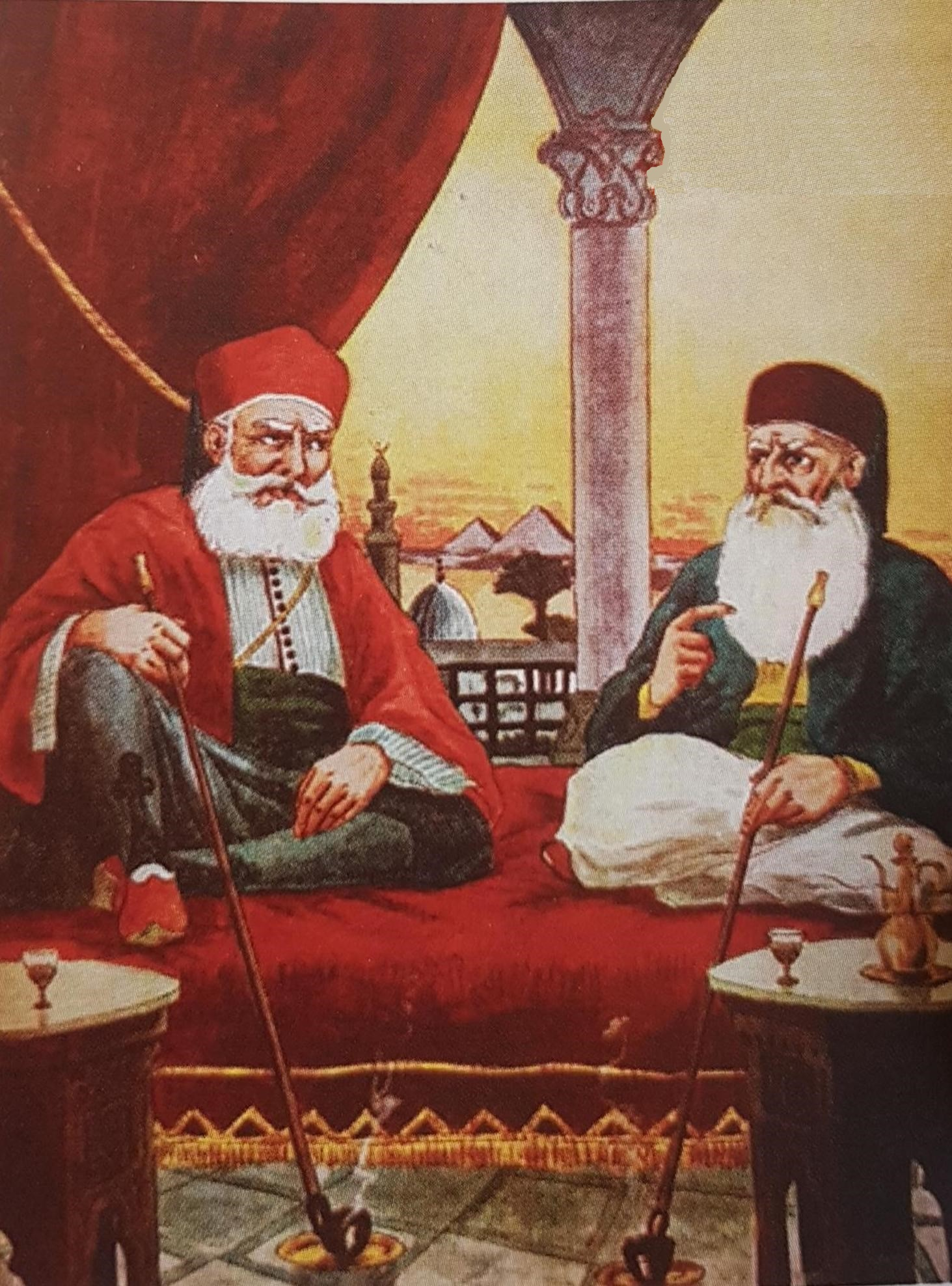
Muhammad Ali Pasha and Bashir II

The Egyptians remained in Lebanon and the rest of the Levant for 9 years, and eventually the Egyptian army was defeated by an international alliance consisting of Britain, Austria, Russia and the Ottoman Empire, after the withdrawal of the Egyptian army, Emir Bashir II was exiled to Malta and then to Constantinople when he died in 1850, thus, those who had emigrated from the Druze leaders and their fiefs, fleeing from the oppression of the previous Emir and the Egyptians, returned to Lebanon.

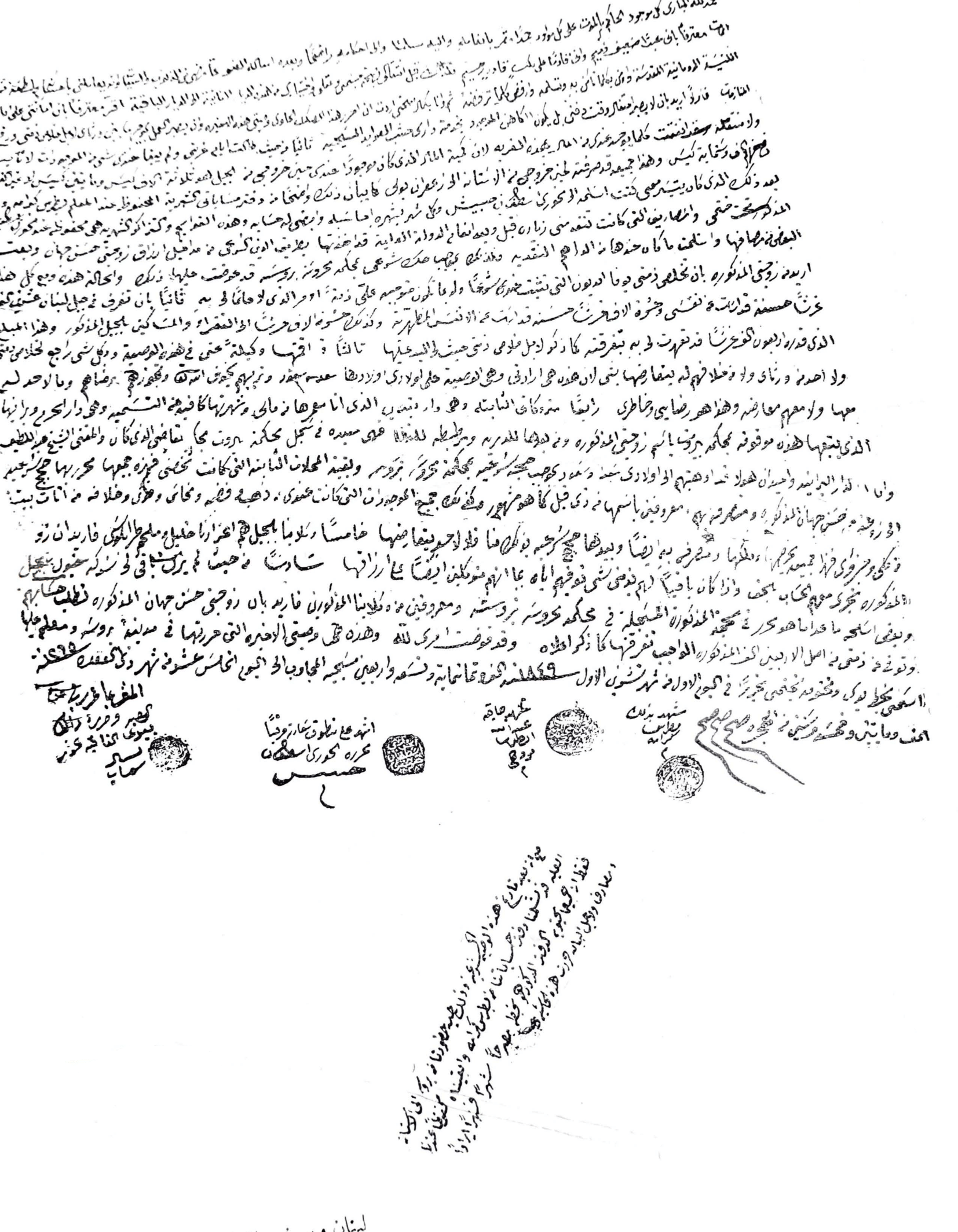
Bashir II Shihab's last will

At that time, the Ottomans appointed Prince Bashir bin Qasim bin Melhem al-Shihabi (r. 1840–1842) as the country's emir. He was known as Bashir III, and his first weakness was that the Ottomans chose him, and he was not elected by native Muslim and Christian notables, as was the case in choosing most of the previous princes. The Ottomans chose him because he was weak-willed, therefore making it easy for them to direct him to implement their policy without objection, especially since foreign interference in Lebanese and Syrian affairs, especially the French and British interference, had intensified since the era of Egyptian rule in the Levant, which made the Ottomans suffer greatly in preserving Arab lands from European ambitions. The situation worsened matters for Bashir III, as the nine years of Egyptian rule had left an atmosphere of suspicion between the Druze and the Maronites that was not easy to forget; furthermore, the Druze, led by their feudal lords, had been demanding the new prince to return to the old regime during the days of the former emir, that is, that system that ensured that their weapons would remain in their hands and the return of their lands to them, while the Maronites demanded to maintain the new system established by the Egyptians, which is to reduce the authority of the feudal lords and disarm them and not to submit the peasant to the authority of the owner of the land, and since most of the farmers were Maronite Christians, this seemed to be a challenge to the entire Druze community.

Bashir III did not care about the demands of the Druze, as he refused to extract the land from the new owners who bought it from the previous emir, and he was not satisfied with that, but stripped a number of other feudal lords of their remaining privileges in collecting taxes, maintaining security in their areas, and exercising judicial authority. And since this prince was among the Shehab princes who converted to Christianity at an earlier time, the Druze considered him an apostate, a traitor to Islam and the Druze community in particular, before others, and the mutual hatred between them and Christians increased, until it turned in the year 1841 into a bloody conflict between Druze and Maronite peasants because of a dispute over the eligibility of a Maronite crossing and hunting partridge on land owned by a Druze.

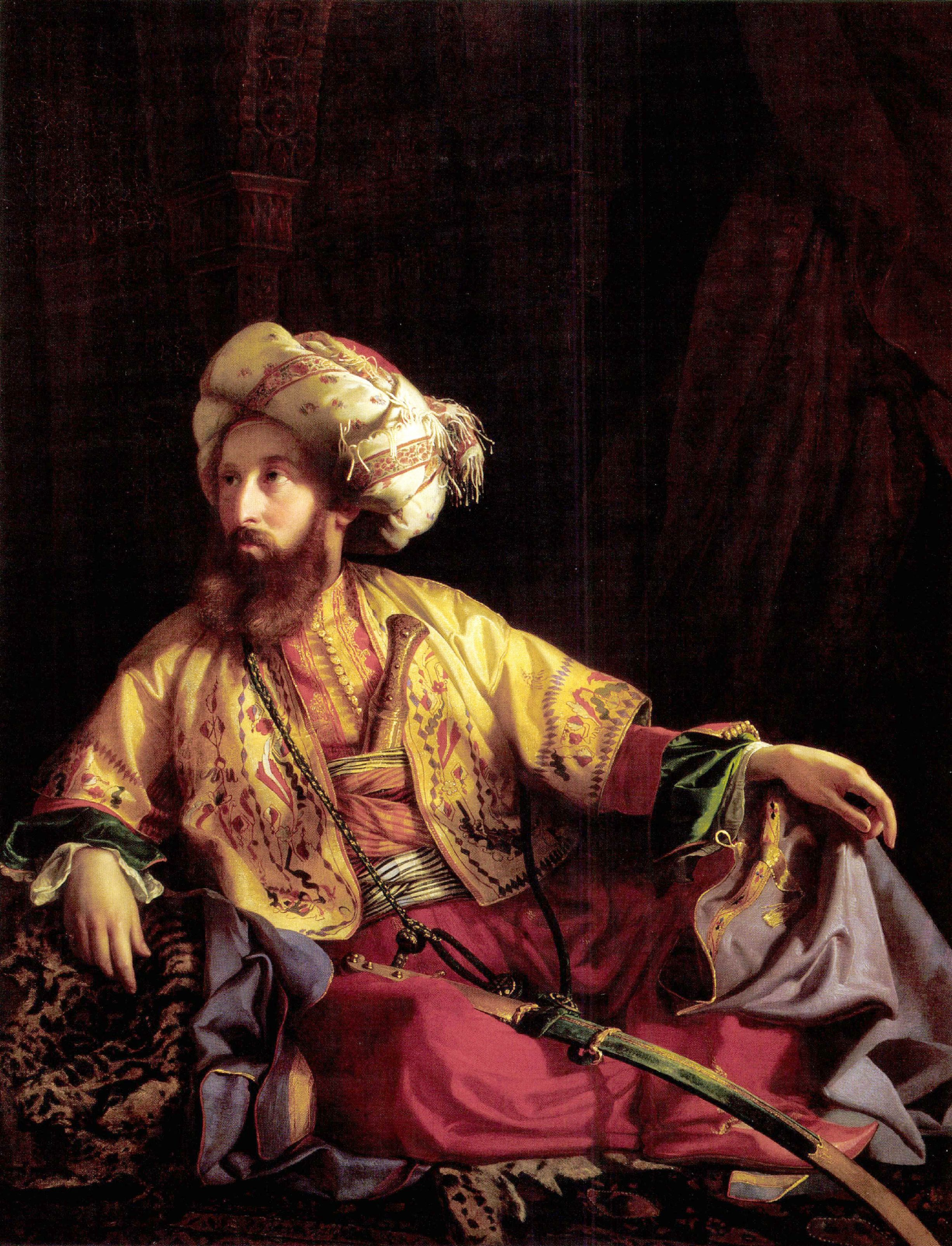
Emir of Lebanon, by József Borsos, 1843

Usually, in these types of incidents, the sheikhs and the 'Uqalā' ("Those of Good-Will") would have intervened to solve it, and if they were not successful, they would raise the matter to the emir, who would issue his ruling and restore things to normal, but anxiety and tension among the population and the emir being unable to impose his will on a party that did not recognize him prevented such solutions. The conflict moved to some areas in the Beqaa, and it reached its climax when some Druze besieged the emir in the Deir al-Qamar Palace and then stormed him and arrested the emir and mistreated him. The Ottomans seized this opportunity and dealt their final blow. On 13 December 1842, that is, three months after the start of the unrest, the governor of Beirut summoned Prince Bashir III from Deir al-Qamar to Beirut, from which an Ottoman ship took him to Constantinople.

=== The double Qa’im-Maqamate of Mount Lebanon ===
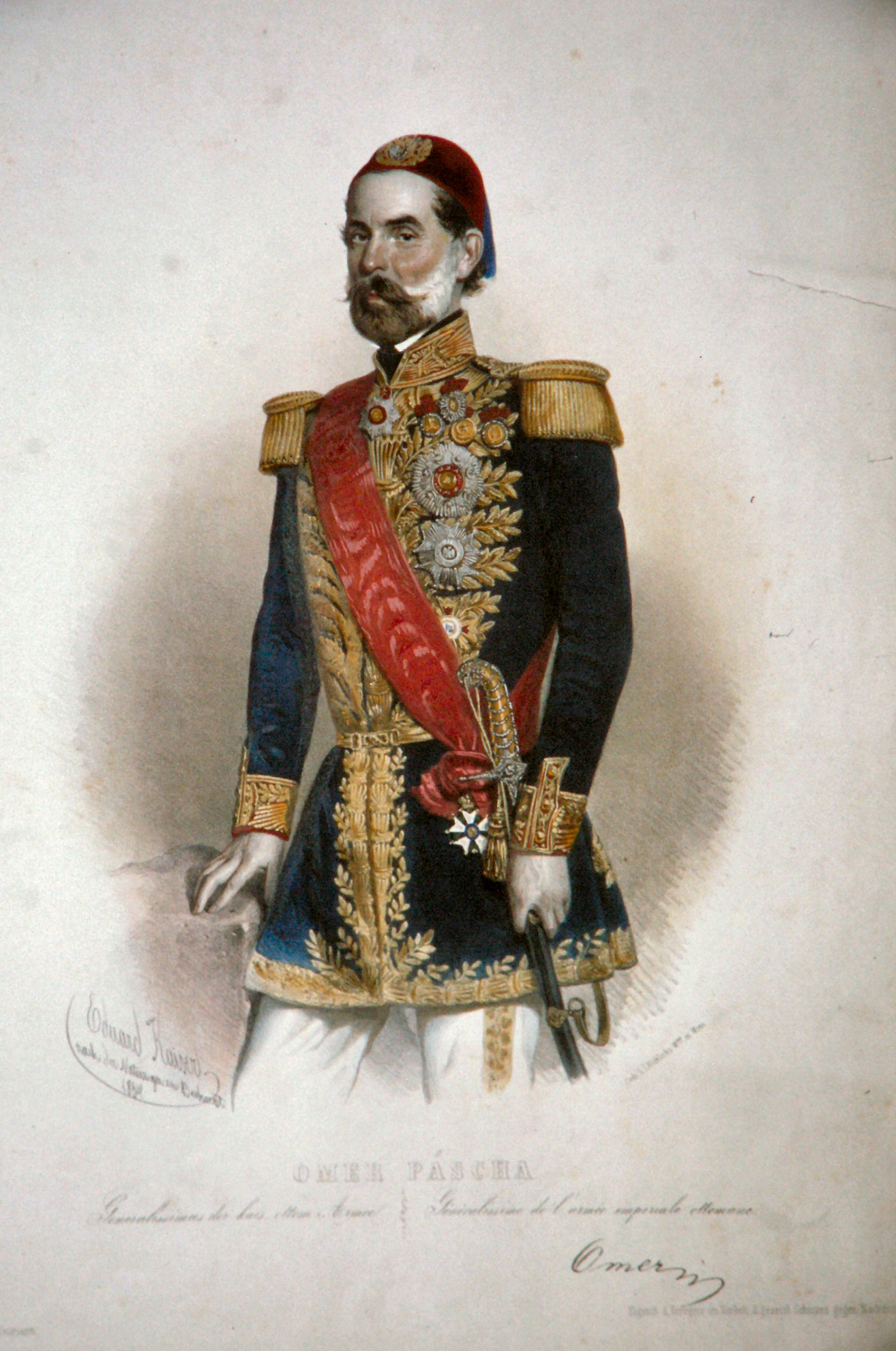
Omar Pasha – Lithograph

After the removal of Prince Bashir III, the Lebanese Chehab emirate, which had been the ruling entity of the country and its population for many years, collapsed. The Ottomans appointed one of the most senior officials as direct ruler on the mountain, this being a Sunni Muslim of Austrian birth and Serbian ancestry named Omar Pasha Latas. The Druze welcomed him, the Christians rejected him, and the majority of the Christians stood by the Maronite Patriarch Youssef Boutros Hobeish, who announced that he refused to cooperate with any non-Lebanese ruler or any ruler not chosen by the Lebanese themselves. The Pasha had hired agents to edit petitions that showed the people's support for him and their refusal to return to the Chehab rule. A number of people signed these petitions in exchange for a bribe, a promise or a threat, and some of them signed them with consent, when the matter of the petitions was exposed in Constantinople and the Porte got determined to dismiss the Austrian, the Pasha tried to lure the Druze to him and persuade them to fight the Christians population, but the Druze, feeling that the Pasha had taken advantage of them, led forces against him and almost stormed his palace, had it not been for a battalion of the Ottoman soldiers had rescued him, then he was sent to Beirut, where he was dismissed from his position, on the same day, the Porte and representatives of European countries reached in Constantinople a new project to govern Mount Lebanon, and to be implemented in early 1843.

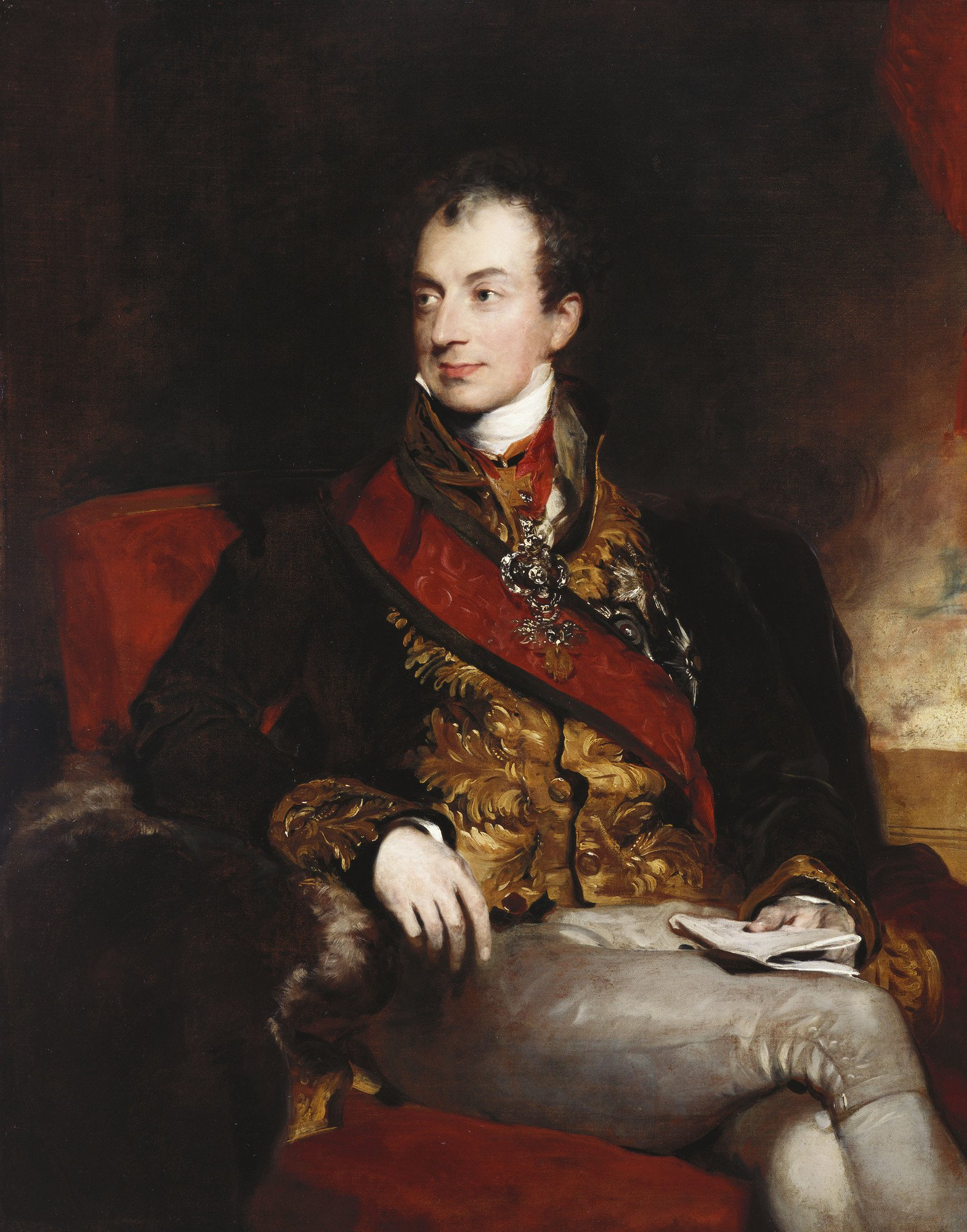
Klemens von Metternich, architect of the Kaimakamat System

After dismissing Omar Pasha of his position, the Ottoman government tried to appoint two non-Lebanese Ottoman rulers in his place, one on the south of the mountain, that is, on the Druze-majority side, and the other on the north of the mountain, that is, on the Christian-majority side, with the rulers being the subject of the Governor of Beirut; but the Europeans stood in the way of the Ottoman plan, as it entailed strengthening the Ottoman Islamic grip on Mount Lebanon, and since the influence of the Ottoman Empire was weakening at the time and unable to compete with the European influence, the Sultan accepted the proposals of representatives of the great powers to divide the mountain into a Christian and a Druze side. On 1 December 1843, the Sultan agreed to the proposal of Prince Metternich, Chancellor of Austria, and asked Asaad Pasha, the governor of Beirut, to divide Mount Lebanon into two provinces: a northern province ruled by a Christian Qa’im-Maqam and a southern province governed by a Druze Qa’im-Maqam, both of whom are chosen by the notables, and are subject to the Governor of Beirut, this system was later known as the double Qa’im-Maqamate system.

The defects of the double Qa’im-Maqamate system became clear when sectarian strife continued under it, the reason being that this system not only failed to eliminate the causes of discord among the inhabitants of the mountain, but also added to it a new factor of discrimination and conflict, the factor being the class struggle between the feudal lords and the common people, after taking away from the Druze and Christian feudal leaders their judicial and financial powers, and making them the prerogative of the Qaimaqam and the Qaimaqam Council. In the year 1856, Sultan Abd al-Majid I issued his famous edict, in which he equalized all Ottoman subjects, regardless of their different religious beliefs, and abolished the political and social privileges enjoyed by a group or a sect. The Christians were at the forefront of those adhering to the provisions of this decree, as they constituted most of the peasants and the majority of the working class. The peasants in the Christian areas, led by Tanyus Shahin, revolted against the feudal lords and burned their palaces and robbed their crops. Shahin used the reform edicts to support demands of the peasants. Shahin therefore focused on equality between rich and poor, not only between religious communities. Equality between rich and poor mainly emphasized the dynamics between peasants and landlords. The Ottoman authorities did not reciprocate, nor accept the interpretation of Shahin. Then the movement of revolution spread to the south of Mount Lebanon, where the farmers were a mixture of Druze and Christians; however, at that time, confidence was already lost between the two parties, making it impossible to unite the two communities for their common interest against their feudal leaders. The Druze feudal leaders took advantage of religious ties, and they convinced their community that conflict between them and the Christians existed and that the Christians could not be trusted, and urged the community to support their leaders and rally around them to defend their faith.

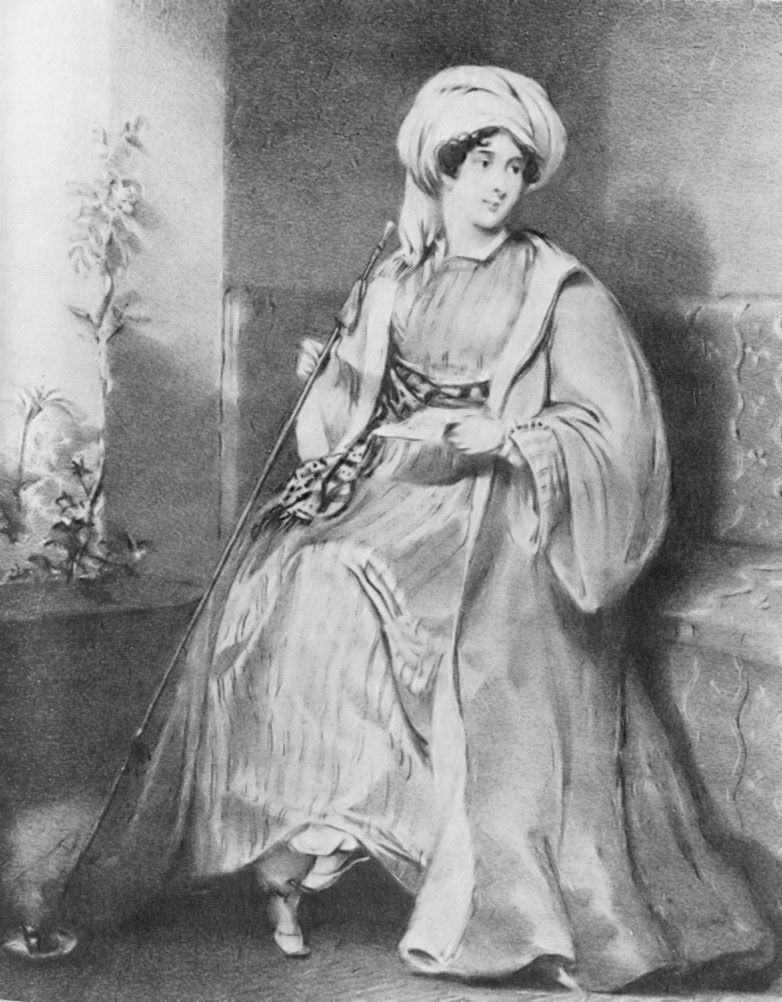
Lady Hester Lucy Stanhope, a British orientalist who lived for 29 years in Mount Lebanon and had a prominent role in igniting the Druze revolt against the Egyptians and fueling sectarian hatred between the Druze and Christians

Foreign countries played a major role in worsening sectarian hatreds. The British, after their Protestant missionaries were unable to win a large audience of native Lebanese Christians, supported and encouraged the Druze and supplied them with money and weapons, as did the French for the Maronites, with most of Britain and France's agents being Orientalists who spent many years in the Levant. For all of these reasons, the atmosphere in Mount Lebanon had become filled with tensions between the Maronites and the Druze by the end of 1850, and was liable to explode at any moment for the most trivial of reasons.

=== 1860 civil war ===
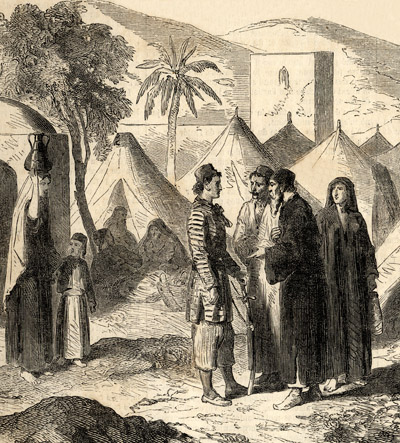
Christian refugees during the 1860 strife

The events of this civil war began on 30 August 1859, with a simple dispute, possibly over a game of marble (although some sources believe that the cause of the dispute isn't known) between a Druze and a Maronite child in the town of Beit Meri. The parents of each of the children participated in the dispute, and it turned into a bloody quarrel in which the people of the two ethnoreligious groups from Beit Meri, then from all the villages of Matn, participated. The fighting got reignited on 22 May 1860, when a small group of Maronites fired on a group of Druze at the entrance to Beirut, killing one and wounding two. This sparked a torrent of violence which swept through Lebanon. In a mere three days, from 29 to 31 May 60 villages were destroyed in the vicinity of Beirut. 33 Christians and 48 Druze were killed. By June, the disturbances had spread to the "mixed" neighbourhoods of southern Lebanon and the Anti Lebanon, to Sidon, Hasbaya, Rashaya, Deir el Qamar, and Zahlé. The Druze peasants laid siege to Catholic monasteries and missions, burnt them, and killed the monks. France intervened on behalf of the local Christian population and Britain on behalf of the Druze after the massacres, in which over 10,000 Christians were killed.

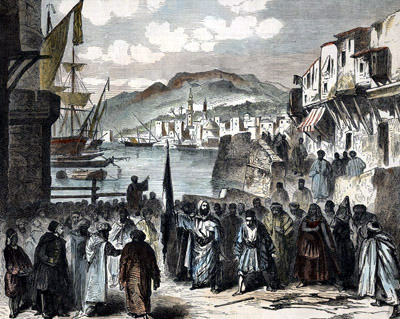
Beirut in 1860, in the center of the picture is Emir Abd al-Qadir al-Jaza'iri, who had come to help end the conflict between the Druze and the Christians

The number of dead reached twelve thousand, and the Druze were the fiercest fighters, it was said that out of the 12,000 dead, 10,000 of them were Christians. Property losses were estimated at four million golden pound sterlings, and the strife occurred during the silk season, which was the mainstay of the Levantine economy in general and the Lebanese mountainous economy in particular. The war destroyed it and eliminated it, and many Christian craftsmen emigrated from Damascus, fearing for their lives, leading to the dramatic decline of the famous Damascene steel industry. The violence of the sedition was mitigated by inter-religious support, with the Druze Banu Talhouq defending Christian monks and sheltering them in their homes, and some Christians remained in the protection of the Druze sheikhs, safe from any harm that might befall on them. In Damascus, Emir Abd al-Qadir al-Jaza’iri protected the Christians, sheltering them in his house and in a citadel; he also took advantage of his influence in Beirut to protect them, Muslim clerics and a number of Beirut notables opened their homes to the afflicted Maronites, as did the Shiite leaders in Jabal Amel.

When Sultan Abd al-Majid I feared that this sedition would lead to the military intervention of foreign countries in the Ottoman affairs, he instructed the Ottoman officials in Beirut and Damascus to end the conflict immediately, and at the same time dispatched the Minister of Foreign Affairs, Fuad Pasha, who was known for his cunning and firmness, and gave him absolute powers to deal with the situation. With his mission succeeding, he executed most of those who caused the massacres, imprisoned the rest, exiled some of them, returned some of the war booty to their afflicted Christian owners, and collected many donations, which he spent on restoring villages.In Damascus, people were executed, exiled and fined for taking part in the riots. Several Druze sheikhs from Mount Lebanon were imprisoned after answering Fuad's summons. Makdisi notes that the campaign fell almost entirely on Muslim and Druze populations. Christians under French protection were not subject to it. The Kisrawan movement ended through the collective action of Ottoman authorities, European consuls and the local elites. The Ottoman authorities at the time referred to the revolt as a result of chaos and disorder, rather than coordinated politics. The representatives of major Kisrawan strongholds declared their submission to the Sultan on July 29, 1860. This resulted in the representatives of the strongholds rejecting the legitimacy of their own movement. Shahin was driven from Rayfoun by Youssef Karam in 1861. The major European countries pressured the Sultan and urged him to accept the formation of an international committee entrusted with restoring stability to Mount Lebanon, liquidating the sedition, and setting up a new system of governance. Thus, the reign of the double Qa’im-Maqamate ended in the year 1861, after it lasted for nineteen years.

== History ==
=== Creation of the Mutasarrifate ===
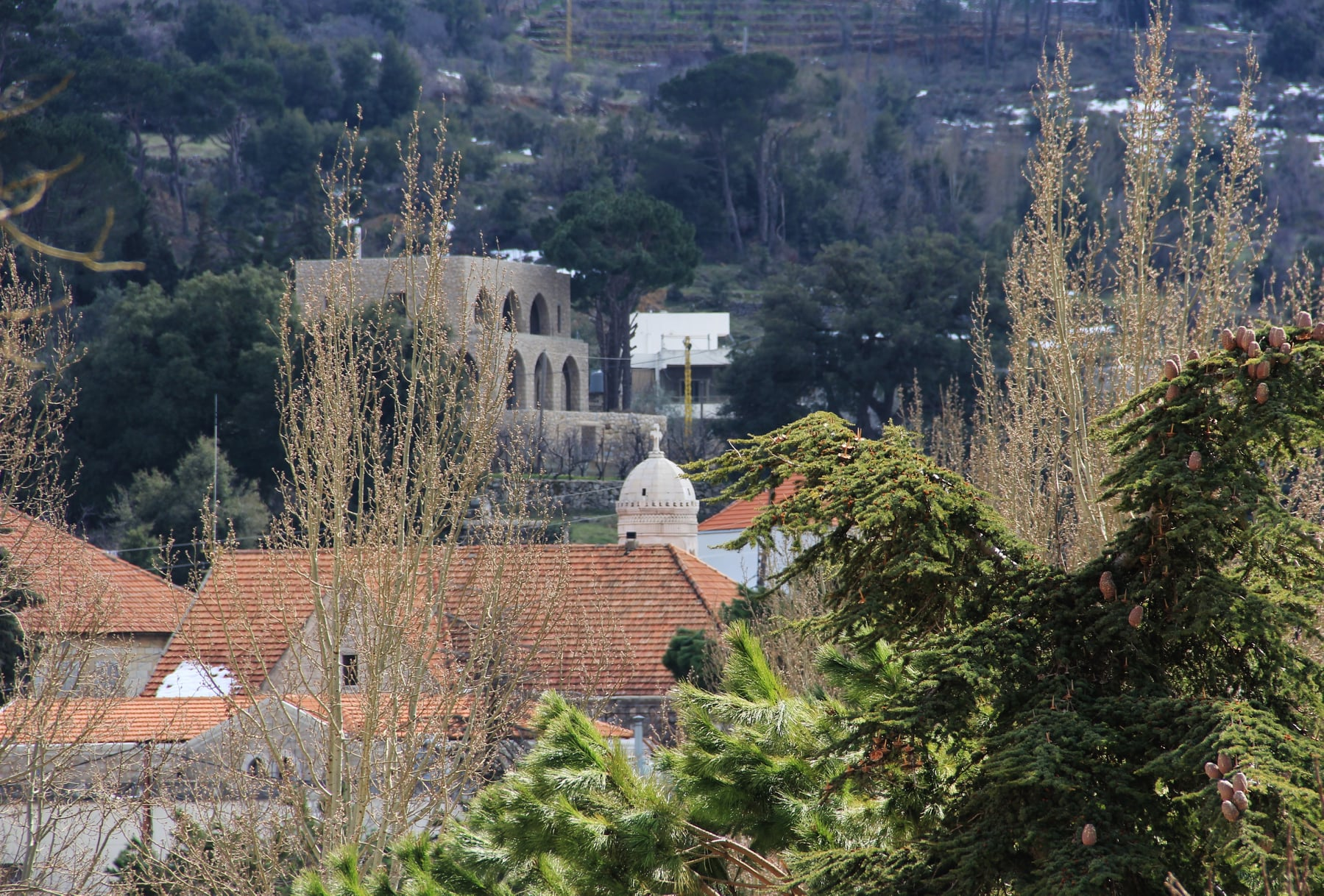
Christian Church and Druze Khalwa in Shuf Mountains: Historically; the Druzes and the Christians in the Shuf Mountains lived in complete harmony

On 5 September 1860, an international commission composed of France, Britain, Austria, Prussia, Russia and the Ottoman Empire met to investigate the causes of the events of 1860 and to recommend a new administrative and judicial system for Lebanon that would prevent the recurrence of such events. The mission of the committee included three fields: establishing security, punishing the guilty, providing relief and compensation to the afflicted, and establishing a new system of government in Lebanon. However, Fuad Pasha did not leave the committee much room to work in the first two fields, because he had established security, punished the guilty and provided some relief to the afflicted before the arrival of the international delegates to Beirut. Therefore, the committee spent little time on these matters, before moving on to the issue of the system of government, the preparation of which accounted for most of the delegates' efforts and time.

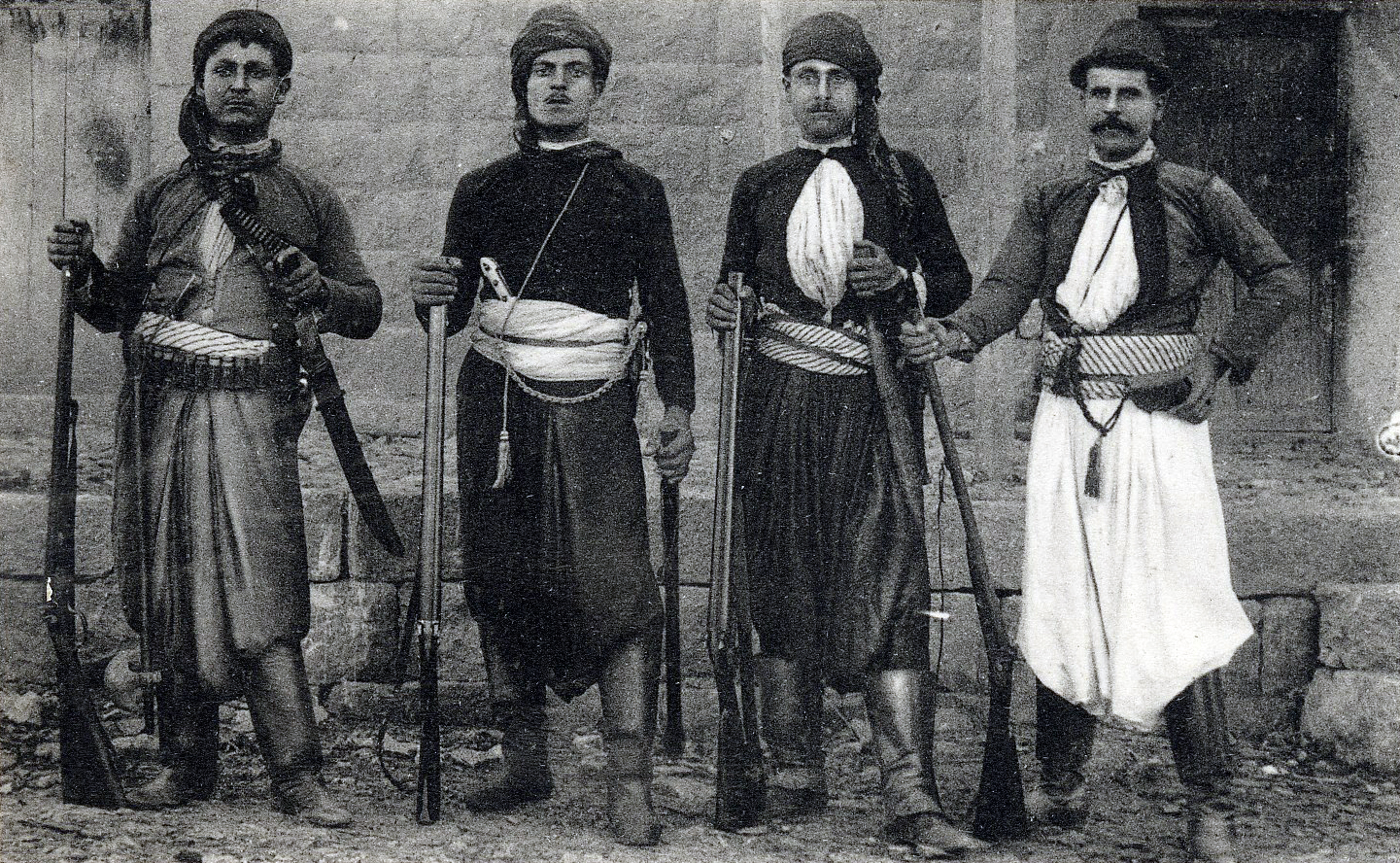
Lebanese soldiers with their full set of weapons during the Mutasarrifate era

Each delegate in the International Committee sought to make the decisions of the Committee serve the interests of their country in Lebanon. Fuad Pasha tried to narrow the scope of European intervention and remove all solutions that weaken the Ottoman sovereignty over Lebanon. The delegate of France was asking for tougher penalties, an increase in the value of compensation for Christians, and an expansion of Lebanon's borders to attract Maronites and their support for France. As for the British delegate, unlike the French delegate, he sought to reduce the provisions and narrow the area of Lebanon for fear of the expansion of French influence in the Levant. After several sessions that lasted a few months, the six countries participating in the committee agreed to make Mount Lebanon a "Mutasarrifate" and to narrow its borders by removing the cities of Beirut, Tripoli, Sidon, Tyre, Akkar, the Bekaa, Marjayoun and Jabal Amel, and to be governed by a non-Lebanese and non-Turkish Ottoman Christian administrator appointed by the Sublime Porte with the approval of the five countries.

=== Naming ===
The members of the international commission researched many names for the new administrative division and its governor. Many titles were considered; Emir (أمير) was quickly refuted because it was offensive to the Ottoman Porte (Emir being a title of the Ottoman Sultan) and was reminiscent of the Emirate system that the Ottomans fought to abolish. Vali (والي) also fell from consideration because the commission members wanted to convey the importance of the rank of the new title which was above that of the Ottoman governors of nearby vilayets; "Governor" (حاكم) was also abandoned because they thought the title was commonplace and widespread. The commission members also ruminated over the title of "President" (رئيس جمهورية) but the designation was not approved by the Ottoman government. After two weeks of deliberation, the French term plénipotentiaire was agreed upon and its Turkish translation mutasarrıf was adopted as the new title for the governor and for the division, which was dubbed in Arabic as the mutasarrifiyah of Mount Lebanon.

=== Règlement Organique ===
In the 1861 "Règlement Organique", Mount Lebanon was preliminarily separated from Syria and reunited under a non-Lebanese Christian mutasarrıf (governor) appointed by the Ottoman sultan, with the approval of the European powers. Mount Lebanon became a semi-autonomous mutasarrifate. In September 1864, the statute became permanent. The mutasarrıf was to be assisted by an administrative council of twelve members from the various religious communities in Lebanon. Each of the six religious groups inhabiting the Lebanon (Maronites, Druzes, Sunni, Shi’a, Greek Orthodox and Melkite Catholic) elected two members to the council. Young men in the Mutasarrifate were exempted from military service. The Ottoman army was not allowed to station itself in the lands of the Mutasarrifate except at the request of the Mutasarrif.

=== The Protocol ===
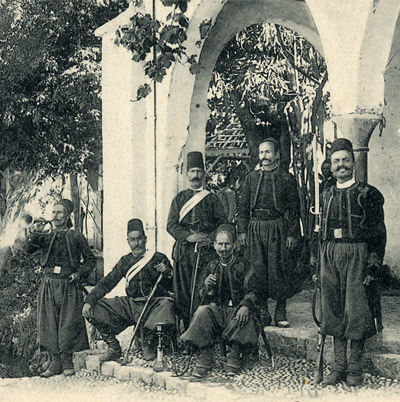
Mutasarrifate-era Lebanese soldiers

The principles reached by the delegates were written in an official form known as the "Protocol of 1861" (also known as the Beyoglu Protocol) and signed on 9 June of the same year. It was also agreed that the system stipulated in the protocol would be put to trial until 1864, and Dawud Pasha, an Ottoman career diplomat of Armenian origin, would be appointed as administrator for a period of three years, at the end of which he would report on the validity and success of this system. When Dawud Pasha's experimental mandate ended in 1864, he carried to Constantinople a report requesting the amendment of some texts of the statute. The Sublime Porte agreed to a part of his proposals, and his mandate was renewed for another five years. The Basic Law of Mount Lebanon, after being amended and signed by the great powers, was published on the sixth of September 1864 in eighteen articles, which included the organization of the administration in the Mutasarrifate, and the most important of which was stated:

- Mount Lebanon shall be administered by a non-Turkish, non-Lebanese Ottoman Christian administrator who is appointed by the Ottoman government and whose source to follow is the Sublime Porte directly, that is, he is not affiliated with the governor of Sidon, Acre, Beirut or Damascus, as was the case with the Ma’anid princes, the Shihabis, and the previous double Qa’im-Maqamate. He must maintain security, appoint judges, and collect taxes.
- The mountain shall have a council of twelve members as follows: four for the Maronites, three for the Druze, two for the Greek Orthodox, and one for each of the Sunnis, Shiites, and Melkite Greek Catholics. Its task is to distribute taxes, regulate imports, and express an opinion on issues presented to it by the administrator.
- All feudal privileges are abolished, and the equality of all before the law is proclaimed. All other articles of the Basic Law provide for the various court systems, the method for appointing judges, etc. The fourteenth article stipulates that security shall be preserved by Lebanese soldiers, as for the Beirut-Damascus road, and the coastal road between Sidon and Tripoli, they are maintained by the Ottoman soldiers. The currency in circulation was the same as that of the Ottomans.

=== The era of the legitimate administrators ===
After the adoption of the Basic Law of Mount Lebanon, the Mutasarrifate became legally and effectively existent, and it was ruled by eight legitimate Mutasarrifs, with their legitimacy being ruled according to the laws stated in the Protocol of 1861. The mnemonic word "DaFRuWNaMYO" (in Arabic, دفرونميا) helped school children memorize the name of the mutasarrifs, and these rulers are:

=== Daoud Pasha (1861–1868) ===
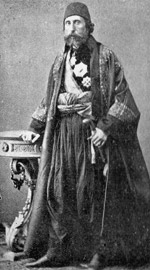
Garabet Artin Pasha Davoudian

He is Garabet Artin Davoudian, better known as Daoud Pasha. Armenian in origin, and Catholic in faith, he was highly educated and was holding the position of post and telegraph director in Constantinople when, in 1861, a decision was issued to appoint him as administrator of Mount Lebanon for a period of three years. He was welcomed by leading Roman Catholic clergy as well as by Greek Orthodox clergy. However, the Maronite community did not welcome him during his tenure. Youssef Karam was the last Maronite mayor to aspire to become the mutasarrif. As soon that Daoud Pasha assumed his position in Deir al-Qamar, several feudal lords and clerics opposed him, he was able to satisfy them by appointing them to senior positions in the government of Mount Lebanon. But Youssef Karam, one of the young sheikhs of the town of Ehden and one of the national leaders, who was calling for the restoration of national rule, stood in the face of Daoud Pasha stubbornly and resisted him vehemently, and refused the positions he was offered. The members of the International Committee promised him to reconsider his demands, and persuaded him to calm down until the end of Daoud Pasha's term, the rebel was taken by Foreign Minister Fuad Pasha to be exiled to Turkey.

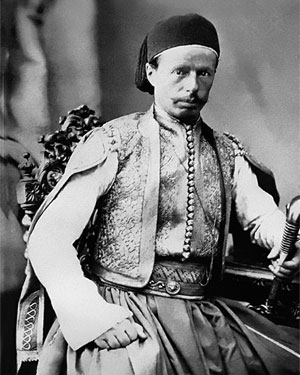
Youssef Bey Karam

In the year 1864, when some articles of the Basic Law were amended, and the mandate of Daoud Pasha was renewed for five years, contrary to what Youssef Bey Karam expected, he left Turkey for Ehden and declared his opposition to the Mutasarrifate government and allied himself with Prince Salman ibn Melhem Al-Harfushi, he gathered around him men for the resistance, and many battles took place between him and the soldiers of the Mutasarrif. Finally, he went at the head of a force to Beiteddine to overthrow the Mutasarrifate government, and while he was on his way to Beiteddine, the Consul of France intervened and convinced him that he should stop resisting, otherwise the signatory states would have to help the Mutasarrifate. At that time, Youssef Bey Karam decided to leave Lebanon, he traveled to France and Belgium, and finally settled in Italy, where he died in 1889, his embalmed body was taken to the town of Ehden, where it is still preserved in its church in a glass box.

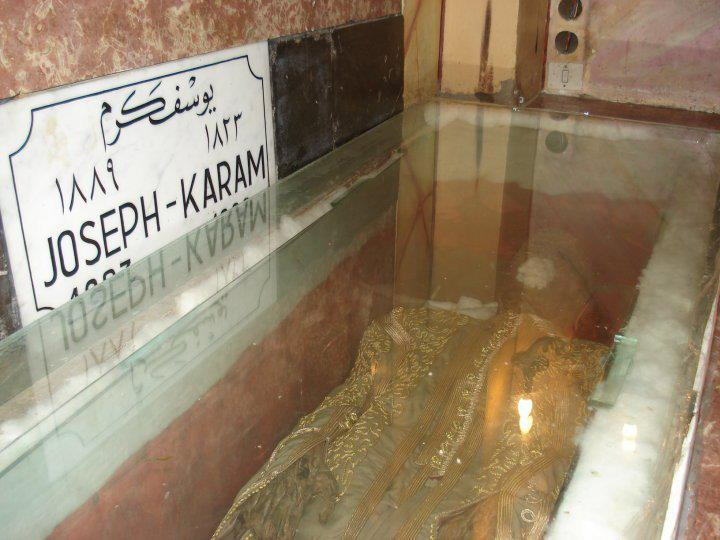
Body of Youssef Bey Karam

In addition to achieving security and stability in the country, Daoud Pasha had to organize the organs of the government according to the text of the Basic Law, and he carried out these tasks efficiently and quickly. He appointed officials in the various departments, conducted elections for Sheikhs who solved disputes in villages and mayors in cities, gathered them to elect members of the Mutasarrifate board of directors, counted the population and surveyed land, and took over the collection of Bekaa revenue for the Lebanese treasury, as well as supervising its management. Daoud Pasha composed a national force of a thousand Lebanese soldiers, and contracted with French officers to organize and train its personnel. He also obtained from the Ottoman government a warship that he called "Lubnān" (Lebanon). In the field of culture, he established the official "Lubnān" newspaper, in both Arabic and French, and established the Lebanese printing press in Deir al-Qamar, and established several free schools, the most famous of which was a school in the town of Aabey, known as the "Al-Madrasah al-Dāwūdiyyah."

Daoud Pasha wanted to conclude his work by expanding the boundaries of the Mutasarrifate, to include Beirut, Sidon, Bekaa and Wadi al-Taym, but the Ottoman government opposed him in that, so when he insisted on his opinion, Fuad Pasha deluded him that if he wanted to achieve his demand, he had only to wave his resignation from the Mutasarrifate, and then the government is forced to implement what he demanded. Daoud Pasha fell into the trap set by Fouad Pasha and submitted his demands accompanied by his resignation, but the Ottoman government rejected the demands and accepted the resignation immediately, thus ending Daoud Pasha's rule in the Mutasarrifate.

=== Franko Pasha (1868–1873) ===
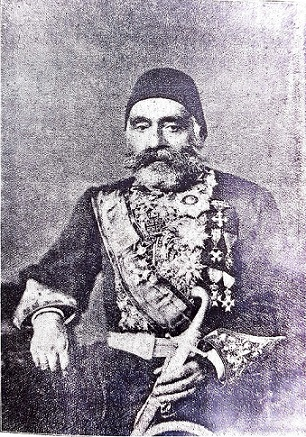
Franko Bāsha

The Sublime Porte appointed Nasrallah (Nasri) Franco Coussa, a Melkite Greek Catholic of Aleppine origin, to succeed Daoud Pasha in agreement with the Six Nations, for a period of ten years, but he died before completing it. During his reign, calm and stability prevailed, and the Lebanese appreciated him for his justice, integrity, and humility, and because he did numerous works for the country such as setting up schools, planting barren lands, and sending a team of young men to Europe to complete their high studies. However, he is also blamed for giving up the Bekaa tax to the Ottoman government, depriving the Lebanese treasury of the important financial resource, and he was forced to reduce employees’ salaries by 10% to find a balance in the budget which led to the spread of bribery among employees. When he died, as demanded on his will, he was buried in the locality of Hazmieh, where his grave is still known today as the Pasha's grave.

=== Rüstem Pasha (1873–1883) ===
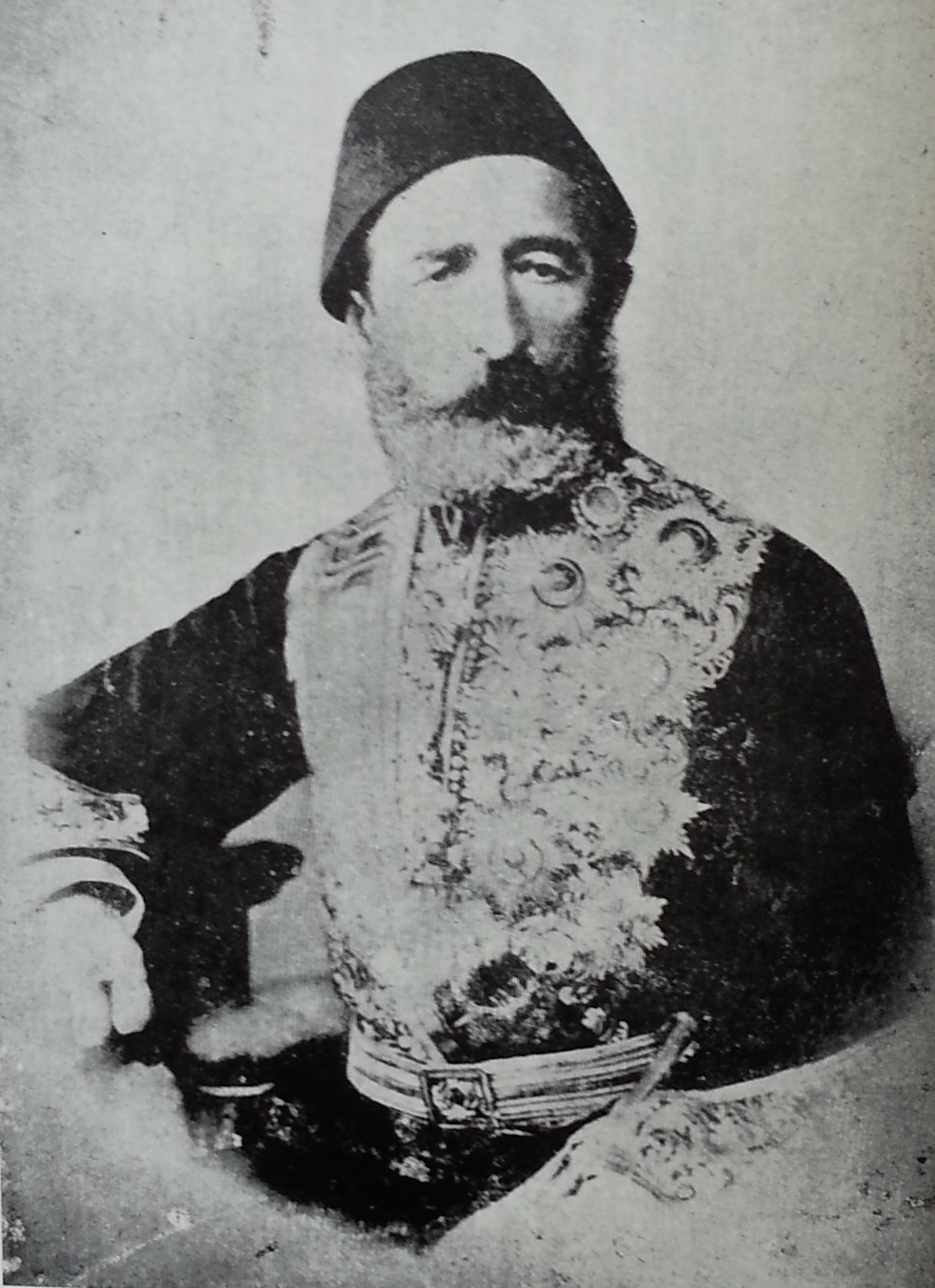
Rostam Pasha "the Italian", 3rd Mutasarrif of Mount Lebanon (1873–1883)

After the death of Franco Nasri Pasha, Rüstem Mariani Pasha, who was the ambassador of the Ottoman Empire in Moscow, was appointed in his place, he was of Roman Catholic Florentine Italian roots, and a naturalized Ottoman citizen, and was known for his firmness and severity in applying the law, establishing justice, and fighting bribery. He made Mount Lebanon and Beirut respectively his place of stay during the summer and for the winter, and he did several construction projects such as opening schools, building roads, and building bridges and establishing outposts to consolidate security, which necessitated an increase in expenditures.

Archbishop of Tyre and Sidon Pierre Al-Bustani

Since the budget was in a state of deficit, he reduced his salary and the salaries of employees and proceeded to increase taxes. Because of the increase in taxes, and several other factors, a severe dispute occurred between him and Archbishop Pierre al-Bustani, the archbishop of the Archdiocese of Sidon and Tyre, he was expelled to Jerusalem. However, the intense protests sent by the people and the intervention of the French government forced the Sublime Porte to return him to the seat of his diocese. Rustem Pasha became angry with the Lebanese population, and took revenge on them by canceling schools, and persecuting the clergy. When his term expired, the Lebanese and the French objected to renewing it, so he was replaced by his vice president.

=== Wassa Pasha (1883–1892) ===
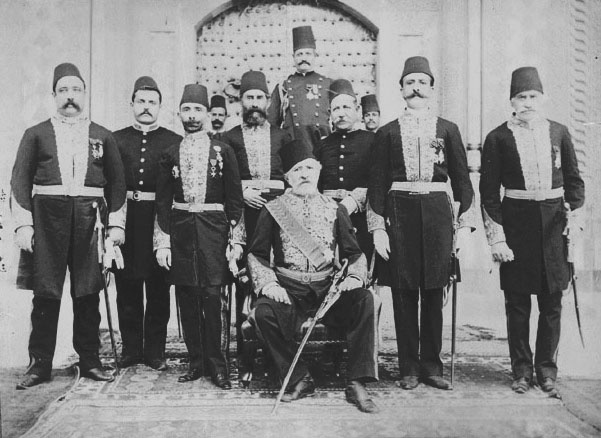
Photo from the 1880s of Wassa Pasha as Mutasarrif of Mount Lebanon

Vaso Pashë Shkodrani, a writer of Catholic Albanian Shkodran origin, ruled as Mutasarrif of Mount Lebanon in the early years of his tenure firmly, impartially and justly, he was a passionate reformer and was willing to improve the conditions of Mount Lebanon, preserving its autonomy and the dignity of its population, preventing the consuls of countries from interfering in its affairs, and was sincere in loyalty to the Sultan and the Ottoman government at the same time. He carried out several construction works, established a hospital in Beiteddine, expanded the Seraglio of Baabda and made it the permanent winter-lodging place for the districts of the Mutasarrifate, he also built the Seraglio of Zahle, and began constructing a Seraglio in Jounieh, he also built roads and bridges, and was the first ruler to excavate antiquities.

During his reign, the Ottoman government adopted a modern system of the judiciary, this system was ordered for application in Lebanon, in violation of the Basic Law. The Lebanese objected to the new system, because it made Constantinople a center for the Court of cassation, and considered this an attempt to weaken the independence of the Lebanese judiciary, and as a burden on the Lebanese, who had to return to Constantinople in their cases, when in the past they all ended in Lebanon. In the last years of his tenure, chaos prevailed alongside corruption, bribery spread, and European interference in the affairs of the Mutasarrifate increased more than before, positions and ranks were sold to the person who increased the price the most to the son-in-law of the Mutasarrif and his wife. This situation prompted the Lebanese to demand the punishment of those responsible of corruption, however, Wassa Pasha died in 1892, eleven months before the end of his term, and was buried in Hazmieh.

=== Naoum Pasha (1892–1902) ===
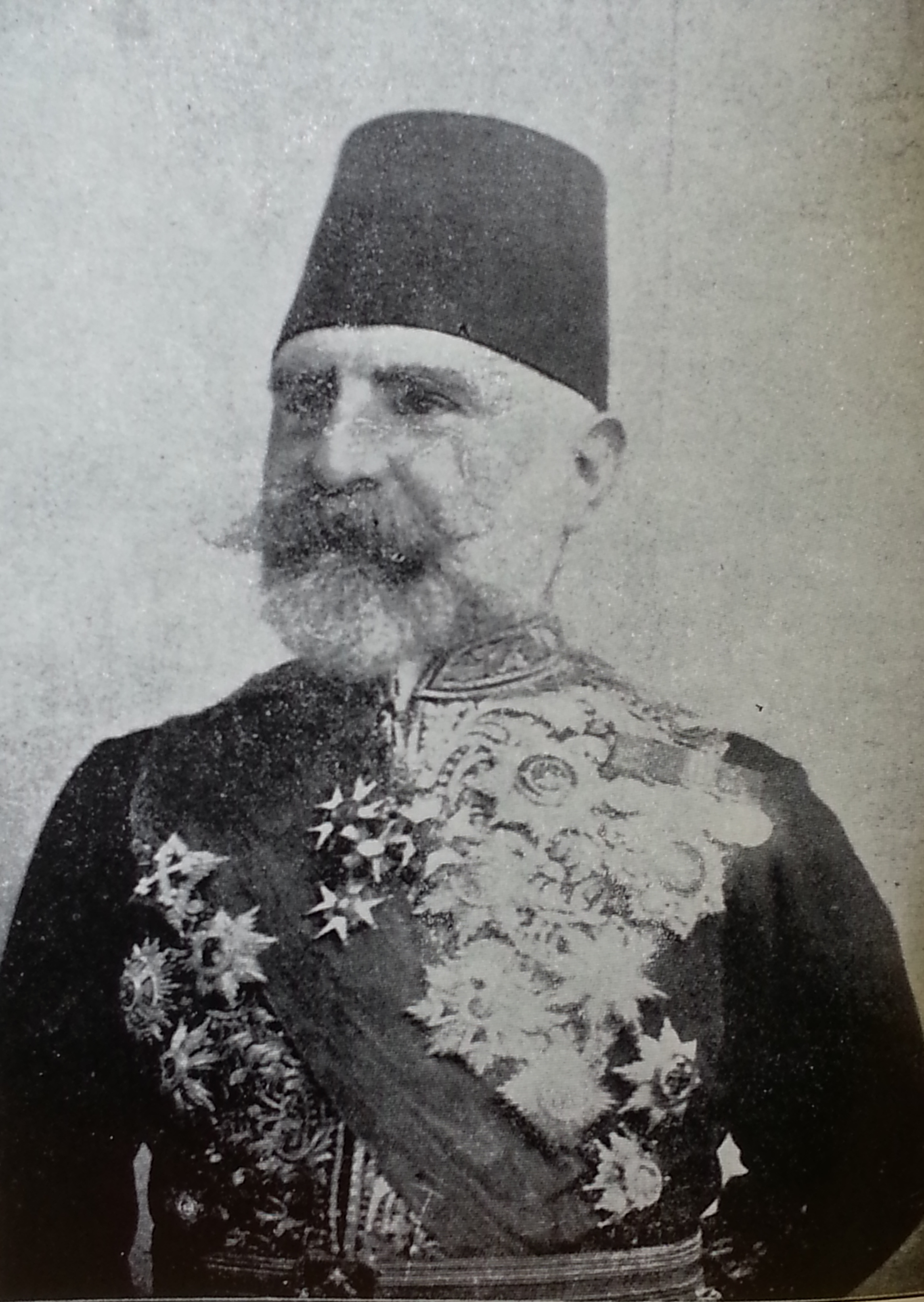
Naum Coussa

Of Aleppine origins, and Melkite in faith, Na'oum Coussa Basha was the nephew of Franco Nasri Pasha. He was known as honest, and firm. He began his tenure by reforming the administration, dismissing employees who were accused of bribery. And he organized the mutasarrifate's finances. Naoum Pasha launched several construction works, repairing bridges, constructing more than 480 kilometers of roads, and erecting several Seraglios in Baakleen, Jezzine, Jounieh, Batroun, Amioun and Bhannes. His reign was characterized by security, calm, and stability, and during this period, migration from Mount Lebanon to abroad began on a large scale. He was known for treating both Christians and Muslims equally, he returned to Constantinople after the end of his mandate in 1902.

=== Muzaffar Pasha (1902–1907) ===
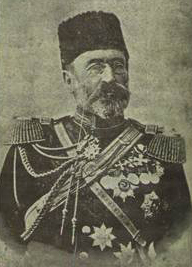
Muzaffar Pasha

Władysław Czajkowski, known as Muzaffar Basha, was a Roman Catholic Polish count who was appointed to succeed Naoum Pasha, despite his good start, he soon dismissed employees, imposed new taxes, and tampered with the rights of the council. The members of the council resisted him with the help of the clergy, until they forced him to cancel his measures. Here a violent struggle arose between him and the Christian clergy, and he worked to establish non-religious associations to weaken their influence. What increased the corruption of his reign was the interference of his son and his wife in the affairs of the state until they had the power to appoint and dismiss employees according to the willingness of these employees to pay the money. Fearing the renewal of his mandate, his opponents tried to send a delegation to Constantinople to prevent this, but he died three months before its expiry.

=== Yusuf Pasha (1907–1912) ===
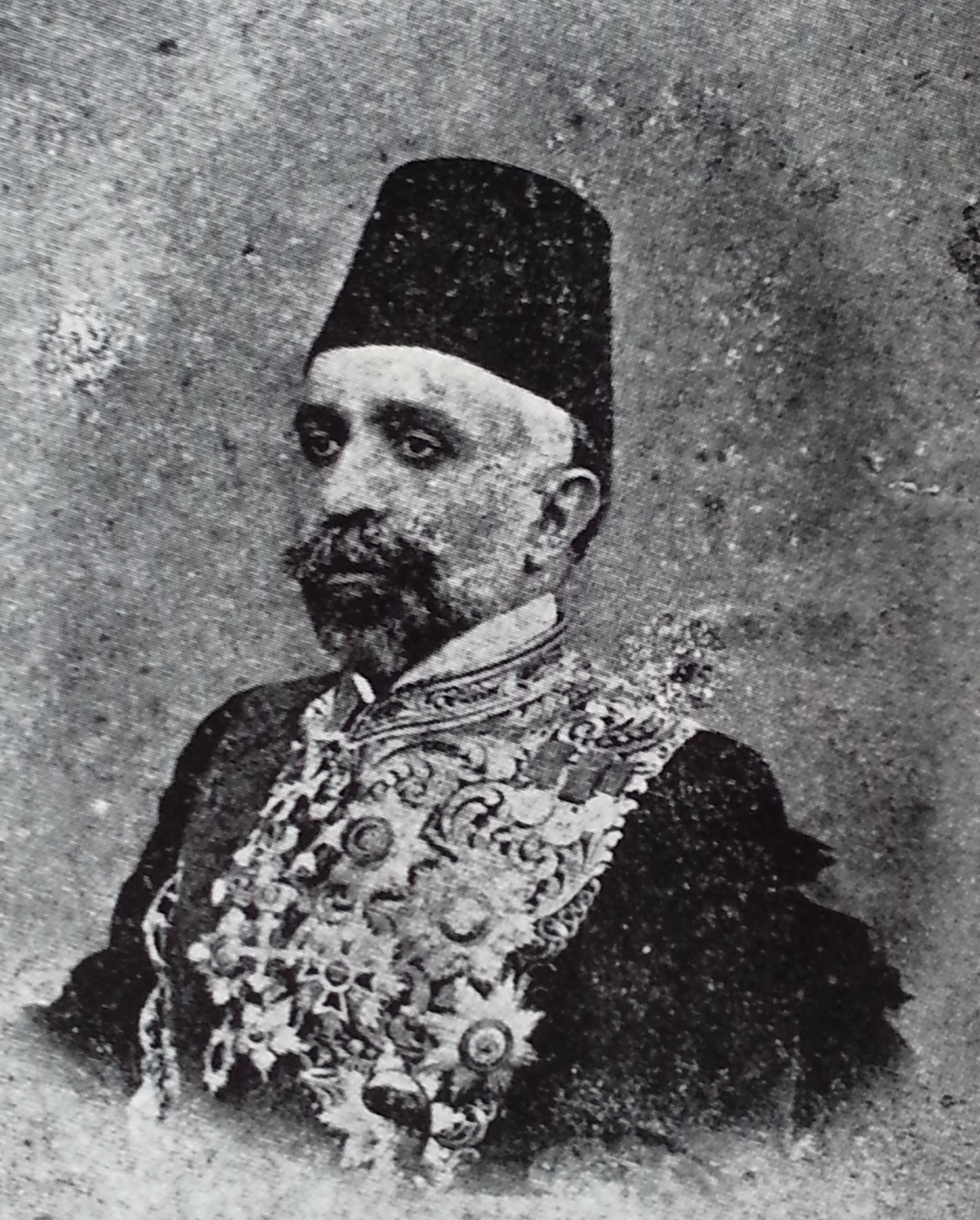
Yūsuf Bāsha

Of Aleppine origins and Melkite in faith, Yusuf Pasha was the son of second mutasarrif Nasri Franco Coussa (Franko Pasha), his reputation was not better than that of his predecessor, although he had a good start, and was thoughtful about his relations with various parties and trends, with the clergy helping him, this situation did not last long, as he violated the Basic system, interfered in judicial affairs, assaulted the powers of the Administrative Council, abolished some opposition newspapers, and tried to force every Lebanese resident of the mountain to take an Ottoman identity card. But the strong opposition that stood in his face forced him to make it optional for whoever wanted.

When the Ottoman constitution was published in 1908, some groups in Lebanon demanded that the Mutasarrifate be included in the Wilayah of Syria and that two members would be sent to represent it in the "Chamber of Deputies" (the Ottoman parliament that was established under the new constitution). However, the strong resistance that arose against this idea did not allow it to come into being, despite the encouragement of Yusuf Franco Pasha. His constant conflict with members of the Administrative Council was the cause of the public's resentment against him, and this resentment did not subside until the end of his term of office in 1912. One of the prominent events that occurred during the era of the Mutasarrif was the introduction of the first modern car into Beirut from Alexandria on 24 June 1908, it crossed the Beirut-Sidon road in two and a third hours, which astonished the population of Lebanon at the time.

=== Ohannes Pasha (1912–1915) ===
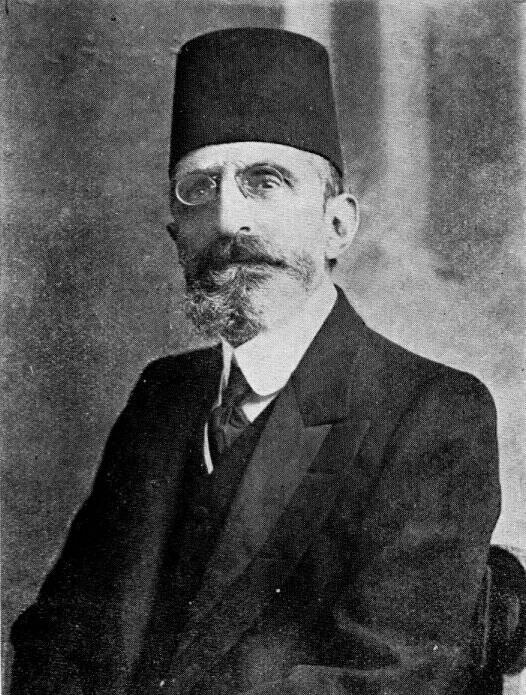
Ohannes Kouyoumdjian Pasha

Ohannes Kouyoumdjian, a high ranking Ottoman Armenian Catholic official, was appointed governor of Mount Lebanon in 1912, and was an advisor in the Ottoman Ministry of Foreign Affairs. The Firman of his appointment included some amendments to the Organic Statute, the most important of which were the following: First, the election of the members of the Administrative Council was not limited to elders as before, and the people's participation in this election through delegates representing one hundred delegates each. Second, allowing the construction of three ports in Lebanon, the first in Jounieh, the second in Nabi Younis, and the third in Chekka. Ohannes Pasha had the reputation of being just, generous and polite, and working for the improvement of the conditions of Lebanon, but he was unable to achieve any important work because he was not able to take over the tasks of the Mutasarrifate until the international conditions worsened, when the First World War soon broke out. And with the participation of the Ottoman Empire in the war, it violated the Basic system, and the Ottoman army entered Mount Lebanon, which led to what is considered as the end of the era of the legitimate administrators, and the beginning of the era of the Turkish administrators.

=== The era of the Turkish Mutasarrifs ===
The First World War created a new political situation in Mount Lebanon fraught with danger to its security, stability and internal independence. The international guarantee that was available to it under the Protocol of 1861 lost its practical value with the division of the signatory states into two warring divisions: the Allied Powers, which included the signatory states of Britain, France and Russia, and the side of the Central Powers countries, which included the signatory state of Austria, and the Ottoman Empire. There was nothing left after the outbreak of the war to deter the newly established government in Constantinople from violating the Basic Law of Mount Lebanon, or to prevent it from interfering in its internal affairs. In addition, the entry of the Ottoman Empire into the war on the side of the central axis countries, made all the lands belonging to the state in a state of war with the Allies, and since Mount Lebanon was part of this state, it became subject to the conditions of the war and exposed to its woes and disasters.

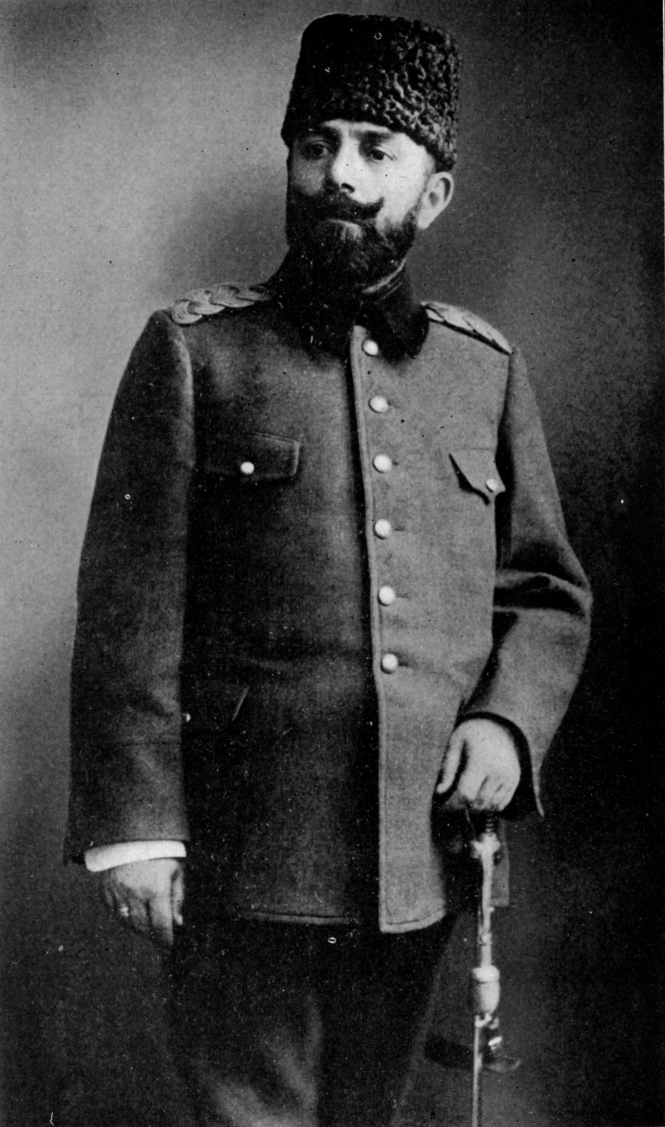
Ahmed Jamal Pasha

Due to the big number of French, British and Russian orientalists who were residing in the Levant, including Mount Lebanon, and due to the presence of a significant number of missionaries and dispatches affiliated with the Allied Powers, the Ottomans decided to invoke military necessities to enter Mount Lebanon, due to the fear of what these foreigners could do to incite the public against the Ottomans. The Federal Government sent the Minister of the Ottoman Navy, Ahmed Jamal Pasha (one of the "Three Pashas" of the World War I-era Ottoman leadership, he is also known as "As-Saffāḥ"; lit. 'the Blood-Shedder'), to the Levant at the head of the Fourth Army, to attack the British, drive them out of Egypt, and seize the Suez Canal, through which most of the war supplies to the allies from Australia, Asia, and eastern and southern Africa passed. In the Wilayah of Beirut, compulsory conscription was imposed on young people, while in the Mutasarrifate, Jamal Pasha carried out several actions that violated the Mutasarrifate system, Jamal Pasha considered all the Lebanese to be enemies of the Sultanate, and he persecuted the intellectuals. He closed newspapers, dissolved associations, put everyone under the watch of spies, imposed forced labor and disrupted transportation., he also feared that the British and French would invade Mount Lebanon from the sea to strike the rear of the Ottoman army and cut off its communications, so he decided to occupy Lebanese lands, effectively turning the Mutasarrifate into a Vilayet (Wilayah). On 22 November, the first Ottoman regiment arrived from Damascus to Zahlé, and from there it set off westward, climbing the mountain to Dhour al-Shwer, the regiment reached it in the midst of a severe snow storm. It did not take long after that, until the whole of Mount Lebanon came under the control of the Ottoman army and martial law. On 28 November, Jamal Pasha broadcast from his command center in Damascus a statement addressed to the people of Mount Lebanon telling them to implement martial law on their mountain and recommending that they be loyal to their state, remain calm, and go about their business.

Jamal Pasha assumed power, and the mutasarrif Ohannes Pasha and all the employees of the Government of Mount Lebanon became subject to his orders, acting on his instructions. Jamal Pasha established the "customary court" in Aley, which is a supreme military court, to try those accused of being disloyal to the Ottoman Empire, and confiscate the property of foreign nationals of hostile countries after the federal government had announced the abolition of foreign privileges, and transformed some Lebanese facilities into military barracks and government departments. Jamal Pasha interfered in the internal affairs of the religious sects, he led an abolition of the privileges of the Maronite clergy, during which he forced the patriarch of the Maronite community and its metropolitans, to request a firman (Note: The Patriarch paid fifty Ottoman liras in gold as the price of the firman, and each metropolitan paid 15 Ottoman liras in gold.) for the appointment of the Patriarch from the Ottoman Sultan, the Pasha also practiced several pressures on the Maronite clergy. Bishop Boutros Shebli was exiled to Adana, where he died, and the seventy-two years old Patriarch Elias Howayek was forced to visit him in Sofar in which he was threatened with exile. Thus, Jamal Pasha has eliminated the old privilege granted by Sultan Selim I to the Maronite community during his conquest of the Levant in 1516. The Unionists went even further in undermining the autonomy of Mount Lebanon when they disrupted the work of the Basic System and made it practically nullified, although Ohannes Pasha tried to preserve the privileges of Mount Lebanon and resisted the interference of the military authority in its affairs as much as possible, but he did not succeed, and he had lost the confidence of the federal government due to his Armenian origin, so the rulers and soldiers harassed him until he submitted his resignation in the month of June 1915. After the departure of Ohannes Pasha, Three Turkish Muslim administrators were appointed to succeed him: Ali Munif Bey, Ismail Haqqi Bey, and Mumtaz Bey.

=== Ali Münif Bey (1915–1917) ===
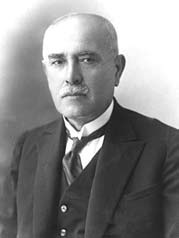
Ali Münif Bey

In September 1915, a royal decree was issued appointing Ali Münif Bey, one of the senior officials of the Ottoman Ministry of Interior, as administrator of Mount Lebanon, Ali Munif arrived in Beirut (where he took residence in Zuqaq al-Blat) on 20 September of the same year and began his work as an administrator on Mount Lebanon under the command of the Wali of Beirut. Ali Munif devoted his works to the abolition of the Mount Lebanon regime and its privileges. He reorganized the districts of the Mutasarrifate, following the example of what was happening in the other Ottoman provinces. And he made many changes between employees, in coordination with the Ministry of Interior. He also began appointing secondary jobs to individuals who were not from Mount Lebanon whom he brought from the Wilayat of Beirut, with some of them being Lebanese or Turks. To complete the nullification of the Basic Law and the elimination of Lebanese autonomy, the government decided that Mount Lebanon, like all other states, would be represented in the Council of Representatives in Constantinople, and due to the difficulty of holding general elections in times of war, the administrator Ali Munif took the initiative to appoint Prince Haris Shehab, Prince Adel Arslan and Rashid Al-Rami appointed deputies to represent Lebanon in the aforementioned council, and they carried out this task until the end of the war.

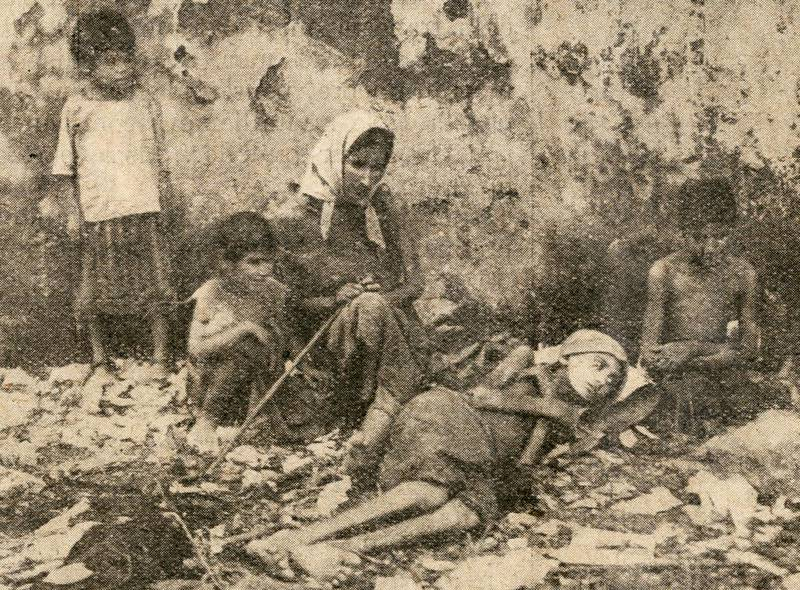
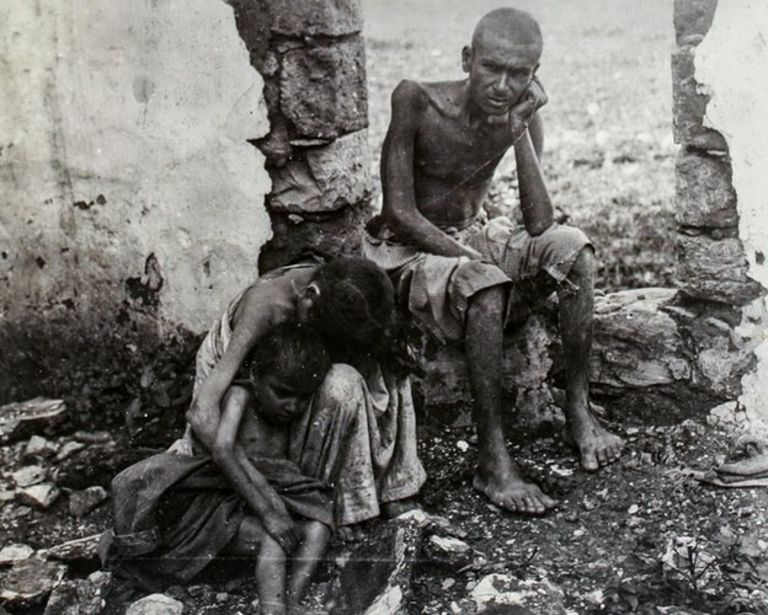
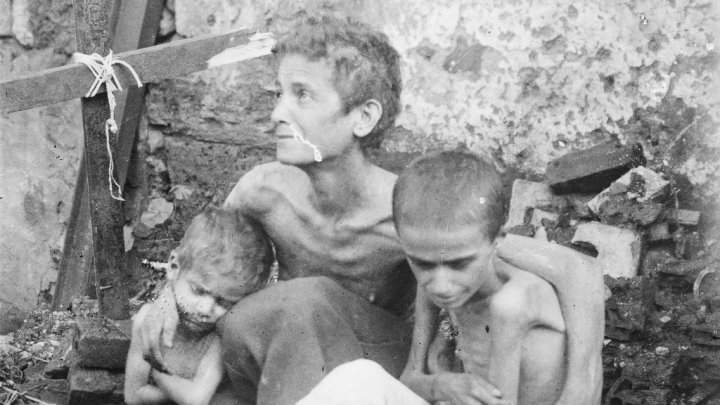
Photos of victims of the Mount Lebanon famine

At the beginning of the reign of Ali Munif, a natural disaster befell on Mount Lebanon, dense locust swarms appeared in the skies of the Levant during the beginning of April 1915, since the Ottoman Empire did not work to combat it in the past, it multiplied after the authorities' attention was diverted from this problem. Due to the outbreak of the First World War, the locusts hatched, and multiplied without hindrance, then crawled north, and when they appeared in the sky of Mount Lebanon, the sun was blocked from the population for several days. And when the swarms landed on the ground, they destroyed the plants and crops, leaving the trees barren, without leaves or fruit. A large part of these trees soon withered or stopped producing for a long time. Because of the locusts, Mount Lebanon was deprived of most of its agricultural production throughout the war years.

Partial list of the deceased in Bishmizzine as a result of the Great Famine of Lebanon in 1916

During the era of the Turkish administrators, the resistance of the Lebanese to the Turkification policy pursued by the federalists intensified, and the Lebanese, like most Arabs before the war and since the Unionists declared their desire to Turkify all non-Turkish Ottomans, resisted this policy with all possible means. Some educated youth formed secret societies that called for political and social reform in the Ottoman Empire. These associations used to cover up for scientific, literary, and religious goals to escape the monitoring and persecution of the authorities. In terms of their goals, the patriots were divided into two parts: a section demanding autonomy within the Ottoman League, and the advocates of this view were generally known as the Decentralization Party, and another section that wanted complete independence and complete separation from the Ottomans. The unionists hated both sides, and persecuted them and anyone they suspected of belonging to them. Among the associations that were established during this era was the "Beirut Reform Society," which consisted equally of Muslims and Christians, and also included two Jewish members. This association was a reformist association that aimed to preserve the unity of the Ottoman Empire while carrying out some administrative and social reforms in it, but some documents revealed that a number of its members, most notably Petro Trad, Who later became President of the Republic under the French Mandate, he and a few other Christian members had signed a secret memorandum under the title "The Situation of Christians in Syria," which they handed over to the French Consul in Beirut, in which they talked about the situation and the persecution the Christians are subjected to, the secret memorandum ended with France calling for the necessity of occupying Lebanon and the rest of the Syrian states in order to save the Christians of the East, despite this going against the will of the association. When the war broke out and the nationals of the enemy countries were expelled, the French consul withdrew from Beirut without burning the important political papers before leaving, rather, he deposited it in a secret hiding place in the wall of one of the rooms, when inspecting the place, the Ottoman soldiers discovered these papers bearing the signatures of 40 Lebanese and Syrians. All the signatories to the memorandum in Syria and Lebanon were arrested and referred to the Customary Court in Aley, where they were accused of high treason, and a large number of them were sentenced to death. The number of death sentences reached fifty-eight, in addition to other sentences of exile or life imprisonment. The largest execution convoy took place on 6 May 1916, when Jamal Pasha executed fourteen Beirut notables in Al-Burj Square in the city center, and seven notables of Damascus in Marjeh Square, and these became known as the martyrs of the sixth of May, and the Syrian and Lebanese governments commemorate their memory every year.

As a result of these executions and the propaganda against the Lebanese political associations and the policy of Turkification, they saw that there was no way for their movement to succeed except by relying on an external support. The nationalists opinions differed in alliances, as some of them considered cooperating with the Arab Revolt led by Sharif Hussein bin Ali in the Hijaz against the Ottomans, it was the only Arab force that existed at the time, and a team of the Lebanese joined the Arab army led by Prince Faisal bin Al Hussein, and this army was fighting with the Allied States in return for their promise of Arab independence. Other Lebanese were dependent on France, and a large number of Lebanese expatriates volunteered in the Allied armies, especially in the French army. In May 1917, Ali Munif was appointed governor of the Wilayat of Beirut, leaving the position of the Mutasarrifate to his successor, Ismail Haqi.

=== Ismail Haqqi Bey (1917–1918) ===
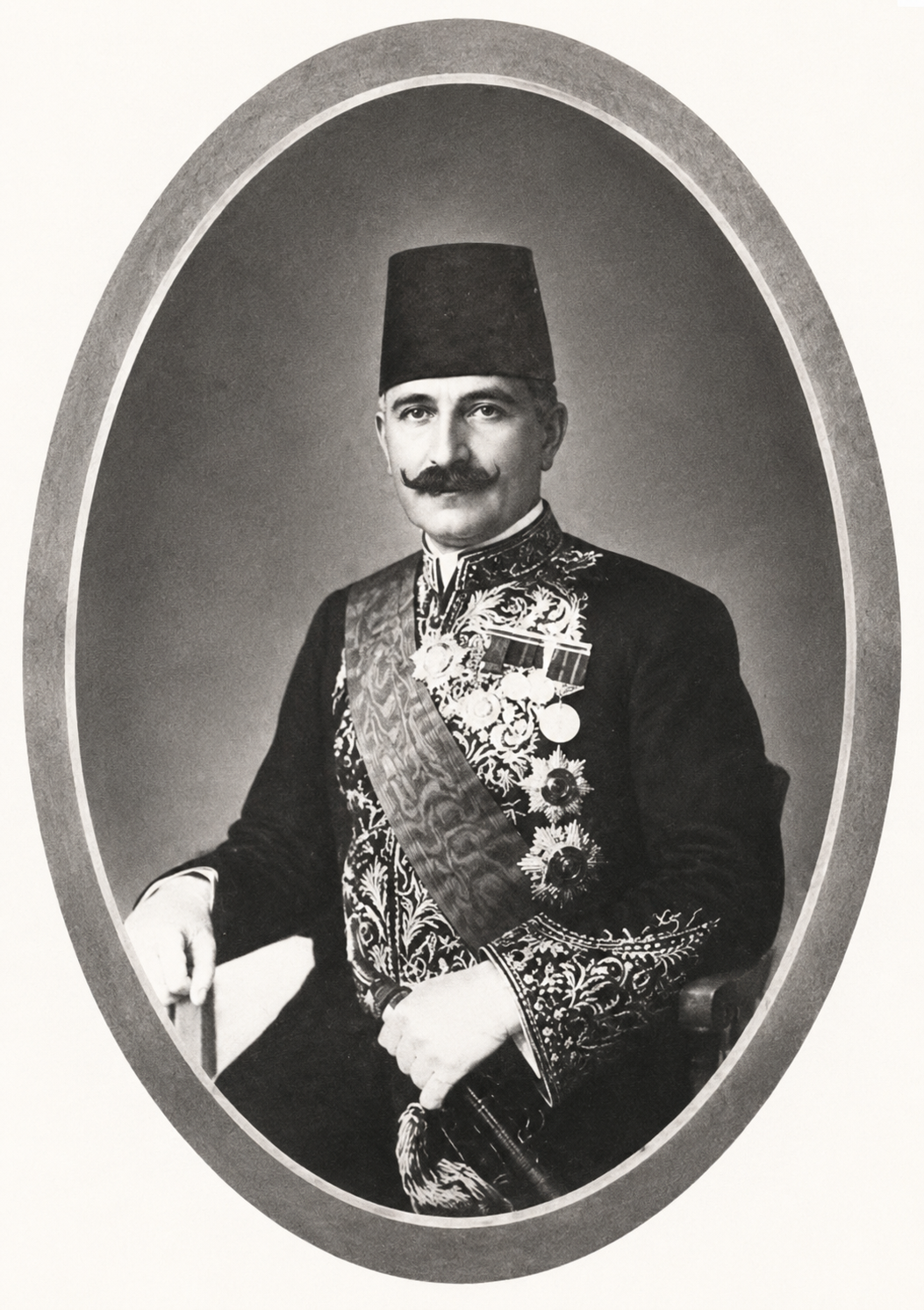
Ismā'īl Haqqi Bey

The Ottoman rule in Lebanon continued during the reign of Ismail Haqqi with the political rules that had been established during the reign of his predecessor. However, the treatment of the new administrator towards the local population was characterized by understanding of their position and their circumstances, leniency and tolerance with them, and a tendency towards improving Lebanon's conditions and advancing it in various respects. Ismael Haqqi was religious, was known for being committed to generous morals, and he turned a blind eye to the food-smuggling to the inhabitants of Mount Lebanon who were ravaged by famine during his reign, and tried to lighten the burden on those who were beset by misfortunes during the war, and encouraged the affluent to establish associations to aid the needy. Therefore, the inhabitants of Mount Lebanon had a positive outlook towards Ismail Haqqi, and were saddened by decision of the Ottoman government to transfer him as governor of Beirut in July 1918 after only a year and a few months before he assumed the position of Mutasarrif of Mount Lebanon.

Despite Ismail Haqqi's tolerance and understanding of the conditions of the locals, his reign was marked by the suffering of the inhabitants, a severe suffering they had never experienced before. As soon as the year 1917 came, the economic crisis had reached its climax, and the Lebanese economic life had completely changed. Many of the Lebanese were forced to wear rags to cover their bodies and ward off the cold, and they returned to using pottery saddles lit with olive oil, due to the inability to obtain fuel, they roasted barley and made it into qahwah instead of using coffea. Anxiety dominated people's thoughts, visits were cut off, parties were neglected, holidays lost their significance, and life became harsh and monotonous, causing fear and anxiety. Because of the disappearance of foodstuffs and the inability to obtain them, many Lebanese did not find anything to eat. So they abandoned their homes and villages in the mountain, and scattered in various parts, some of them reached the Bedouin ranches in the Syrian Desert, and some of them took refuge in Hauran, and most of them went to coastal cities such as Beirut, Tripoli and Sidon, and set out on its streets searching the dumps and piles of waste near the palaces of the rich for leftovers. Some of them went hunting for stray cats and dogs, or even ate dead ones. With reports going as far as recording stories of starving inhabitants kidnapping children, slaughtering them, and eating them, these types of incidents of this kind occurred in Mount Lebanon and the nearby areas.

In addition to famine, epidemics and diseases struck the inhabitants. The lack of food and clothing weakened the body's immunity, and the lack of attention to hygiene helped spread epidemics and diseases that utterly killed the population, the poor and the rich alike. Flies transmitted typhoid fever, lice transmitted typhus, rats transmitted the plague, and contaminated drinking water spread dysentery. Doctors were not available because they were conscripted to look after the health of the Ottoman army, and medicines were not available to the general public. Because of starvation and disease, people were dying by the hundreds and thousands, so that many of them did not have the opportunity to pray for them or bury them. The bodies were collected from the streets and roads in special vehicles and thrown into large pits that were made graves for the homeless. As soon as the war ended, death had claimed a hundred thousand people and afflicted Lebanon with nearly a quarter of its population. Dr. George Hanna, a doctor from the town of Choueifat, who served in the Fourth Army during the First World War, describes the misery he found in the mountain upon his return in December 1917 on a short vacation to see his family, saying:

"In the three days I spent in Lebanon... I saw what I did not imagine that I would see, in a country like Lebanon, which is the paradise of the East. I saw a yellow face like the peel of a sweet lemon, eyes that lost the light, swollen and puffy feet, worn and filthy clothes on the body, and weakness in the body is a harbinger of death. I watched boys, biting their mothers' breasts, whose milk dried up, sucking and sucking, without their mothers' breasts producing a drop of milk for them. I watched mothers begging for food for their children, so they were blessed with sustenance...Wheat is sold by rationing in the most unfair form... A kilo of rice or sugar, if available, costs thirty Syrian pounds. Meat was eaten by the rich only, coffee was absent from the markets... People, however they went and wherever they came, spoke only about bread... There was only one cheap thing in Lebanon at that time, and that thing was death... Typhus was killing the old and the young. Malaria was a heavy guest in every family. And the ghost of Azrael hovered over every house. The dead were buried wholesale. The poor among them, and o' were they many, are piled up in the drums, and they are buried one on top of the other in the pits, not coffins, nor shrouds, nor mourners, nor those for whom the death prayer is offered."

=== Mumtaz bey (1918) ===
Mumtaz Bey assumed the position of Mutasarrif on 31 July 1918, after Ismail Haqqi, however, as soon as he took over his duties, the Ottoman army began to retreat, defeated by the allied armies advancing from Egypt and Palestine. On 30 September, he left his work station in Baabda, fleeing to Zahle, and from there he went to the railway station in Rayak, where he joined the remnants of the Ottoman army retreating to the north. With the withdrawal of Mumtaz Bey, the era of the Turkish Mutasarrif ended, as did the Ottoman rule in Mount Lebanon and the rest of the Levant, after it lasted a little more than four centuries, and the French and British mandate over the countries of the region began.

== Decline of the Mutasarrifate ==
The Ottoman rule collapsed in Beirut, Damascus and Baabda in one day, and before Ismail Haqqi, the governor of Beirut, withdrew, he handed over the means of state rule to Omar Bey Daouk, the mayor of Beirut, who announced the establishment of an Arab government after receiving a telegram from Damascus in this regard, and raised the Arab flag on the city's Grand Serail. Mumtaz Bey, the governor of Mount Lebanon, had, prior to his withdrawal from Baabda, handed over administration affairs in Mount Lebanon to the mayor of Baabda Habib Fayyad. Two days later, government officials met in Baabda and elected the two princes Malik Shehab and Adel Arslan to run the interim government. And when the Arab government of Prince Faisal was formed in Damascus, major General Shukri Al-Ayoubi was sent as governor-general of the Wilayat of Beirut and Mount Lebanon, he came to Beirut on 7 October and announced the country's entry under Faysal's rule, then he went to the government center in Baabda and announced, in a massive celebration, the establishment of the Arab government in Mount Lebanon, and the Arab flag was raised over the Serail. The legitimate board of directors elected in 1912 came to a meeting, and assigned its president, Habib Pasha al-Saad, to head the government in Mount Lebanon by Prince Faisal in the name of his father, Sharif Hussein. Saad accepted this assignment and swore an oath of loyalty and devotion to Sharif Hussein.

During the first ten days of October 1918, the British army advancing from Palestine reached Beirut, following the coastal road, with a French detachment led by Colonel De Piépape. The French fleet landed in Beirut a group of French soldiers as well. Upon a French protest, the Commander in Chief, General Edmund Allenby, ordered the lowering of the Arab flag, the return of Major General Shukri al-Ayyubi, Faisal's representative, to Damascus, and the dissolution of the Arab governments in Beirut, Baabda, and other coastal cities, and appointing French military governors there. Thus, the Arab rule in these areas ended after only a few days of its establishment.

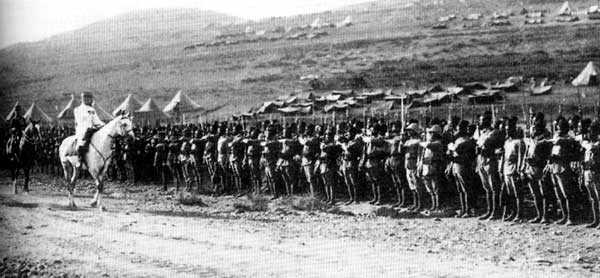
General Henry Gouraud inspects his soldiers in Maysaloun, before the decisive battle with the Faisali army, which resulted in the expansion of the borders of the Mount Lebanon Mutasarrifate to become Greater Lebanon

The victorious Allies held a conference in the city of Versailles, which resulted in the signing of a peace treaty between them and the losing countries, which relinquished their colonies and parts of their lands to the Allies, It also included the adoption of a new system of government, which is the mandate system, i.e., that a victorious country takes over the affairs of one of the colonies or lands formerly belonging to a defeated country, on the pretext that this colony is not yet able to manage its affairs on its own. When this principle was approved and it was decided that Syria and Lebanon would be under the mandate of the French, General Henri Gouraud was appointed as its high commissioner, and he issued a warning to King Faisal, ruler of the Arab Kingdom of Syria, after he declared his accession to the throne of Syria, and asked him to recognize the French mandate, But King Faisal refused the warning, and Gouraud's response was his order to the French army to march to Damascus in Syria, where he arrived at the Maysalun passageway, meeting with the Syrian army, and a violent battle took place, which resulted in the victory of the French majority after the fall of the resistance and of their leader Yusuf al-Azma. As a result of the Battle of Maysaloun, all of Syria was owed to the French, subsequently, General Gouraud went to organize Lebanon politically and administratively, and on 31 August 1920, he issued a decree in which he included in Mount Lebanon the cities of Beirut, Sidon, Tyre, Marjayoun, Tripoli and Akkar, in addition to the districts of Bekaa, Baalbek, Hasbaya and Rashaya.

== Economy ==
Before the First World War, the Mount Lebanon Mutasarrifate economy was based on three main pillars: olive cultivation, silk production, and expatriate money. However, these three elements were not enough to make the mountain's economy strong, sound, and integrated. The weakness of Lebanon's economy was highlighted in a number of respects, the most important of which were the weakness of grain production, the backwardness of industry and restrictions on trade.

=== Agriculture ===
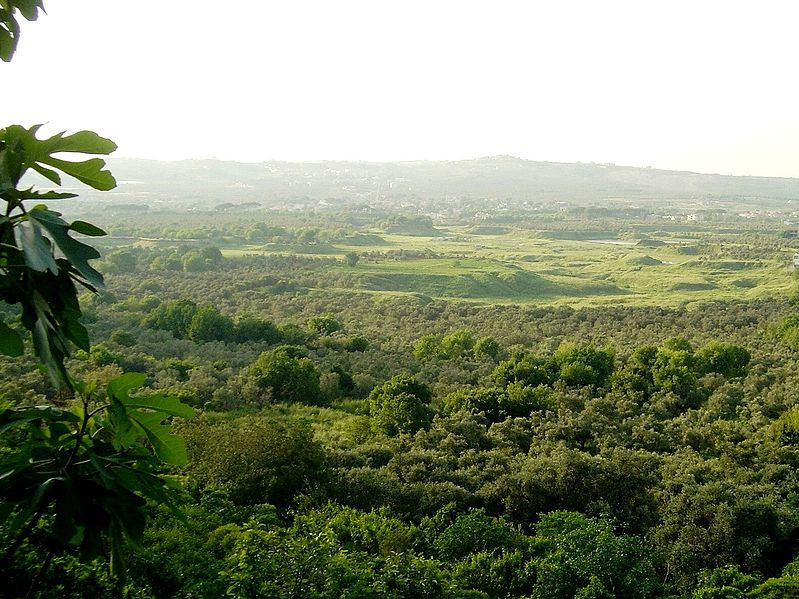
Olive groves in the town of Amioun, Koura district. Since the era of the Mutasarrifate, this region has been characterized by the abundance of oil and olive production.

Most of the residents of the Mutasarrifate were farmers who practiced agriculture using traditional methods and with a characteristic specific to Mount Lebanon, in harmony with the nature of the mountainous land and its surface, its soil and the seasons of the year. The olive groves spread widely on the coasts and foothills of the West Lebanon mountain range, providing work for workers and a decent income for their owners. Olive is an important component of the mountain people's diet and a raw material for oil production and soap industry. The largest part of olive production and its derivatives was consumed in Lebanon, while the surplus was exported abroad, generating an important financial profit for the country. The Lebanese considered the olive tree a sacred tree and its oil sacred, due to its frequent mention in the Bible and in the Qur’an, they also produced different types of the olive tree, most notably: Al-Ṣūrī (lit. 'Of Tyre'), Al-Baladī (lit. 'Of the country'), Al-Shatawī (lit. 'Of the winter'), and Al-Bustānī (lit. 'Of the garden').

In the spring days, the majority of the Lebanese were devoted to raising silkworms, which feed on the leaves of mulberry trees. The cultivation of mulberry was spread all over Lebanon, the coast and the mountains. Several factories were established in Mount Lebanon to extract silk threads from the silkworms, and housewives worked on looms and turned some of these threads into valuable silk textiles suitable for making clothes and furnishings. But the bulk of the silk threads were exported to European countries, especially to France, which was buying most of the Lebanese production.

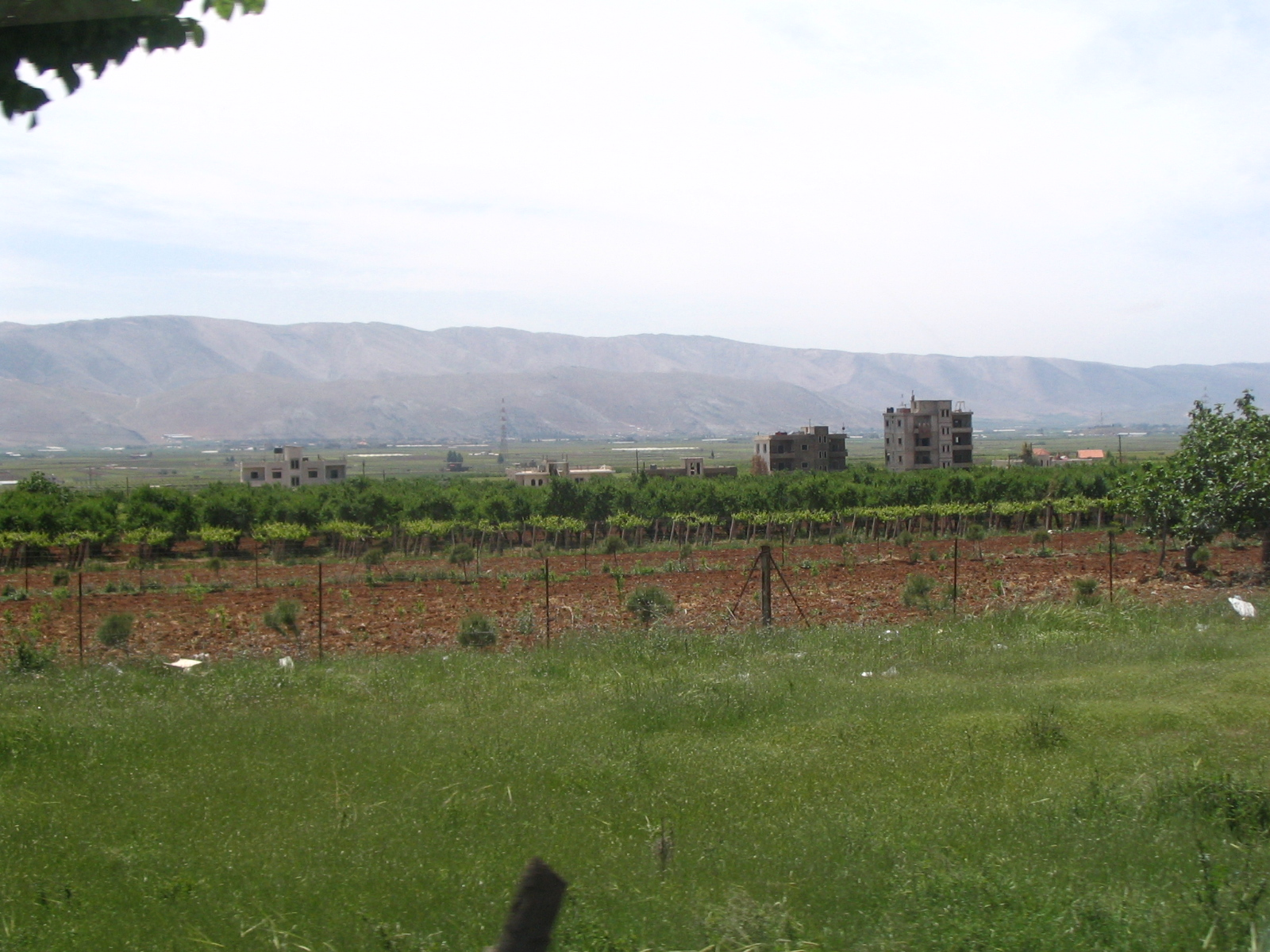
Vineyards near the city of Zahlé in the Bekaa Valley. This city has been famous since ancient times for the cultivation of grapes and the extraction of wine and other alcoholic beverages.

In addition, grapes and what was extracted from them were among the main produce on which a large part of the villagers depended. The wine industry of Lebanon is among the most ancient in the world. Lebanon's wines were mentioned in the Old Testament, and some ancient inscriptions stated that it was made as tribute which the Lebanese population gave to the conquerors, and the quality of Lebanese aged wine in monasteries is famous. Most of the grape production was from wine, 'araq, raisins, and vinegar for local consumption, as was the case with the fig, which was a well-known and desirable tree.

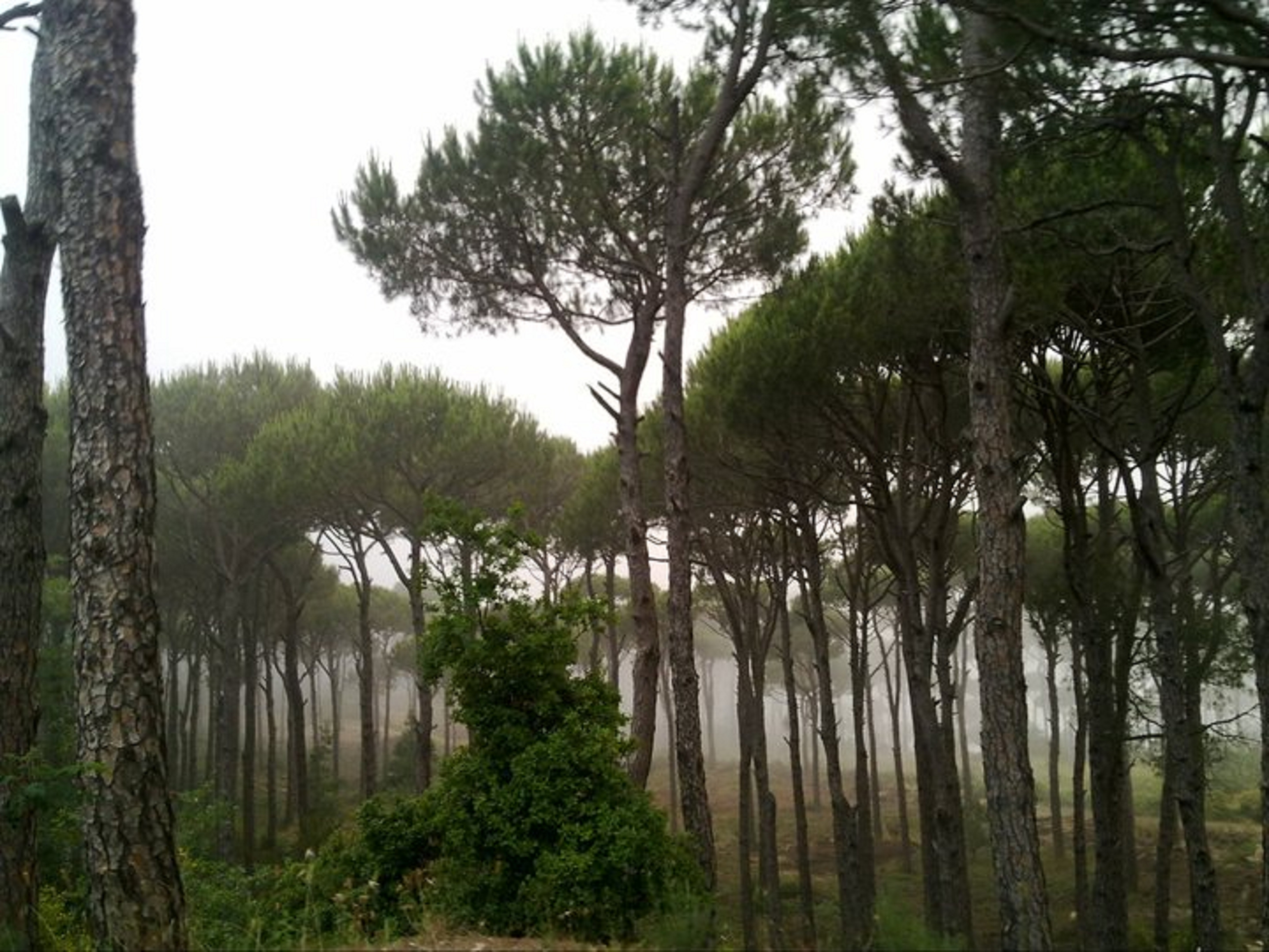
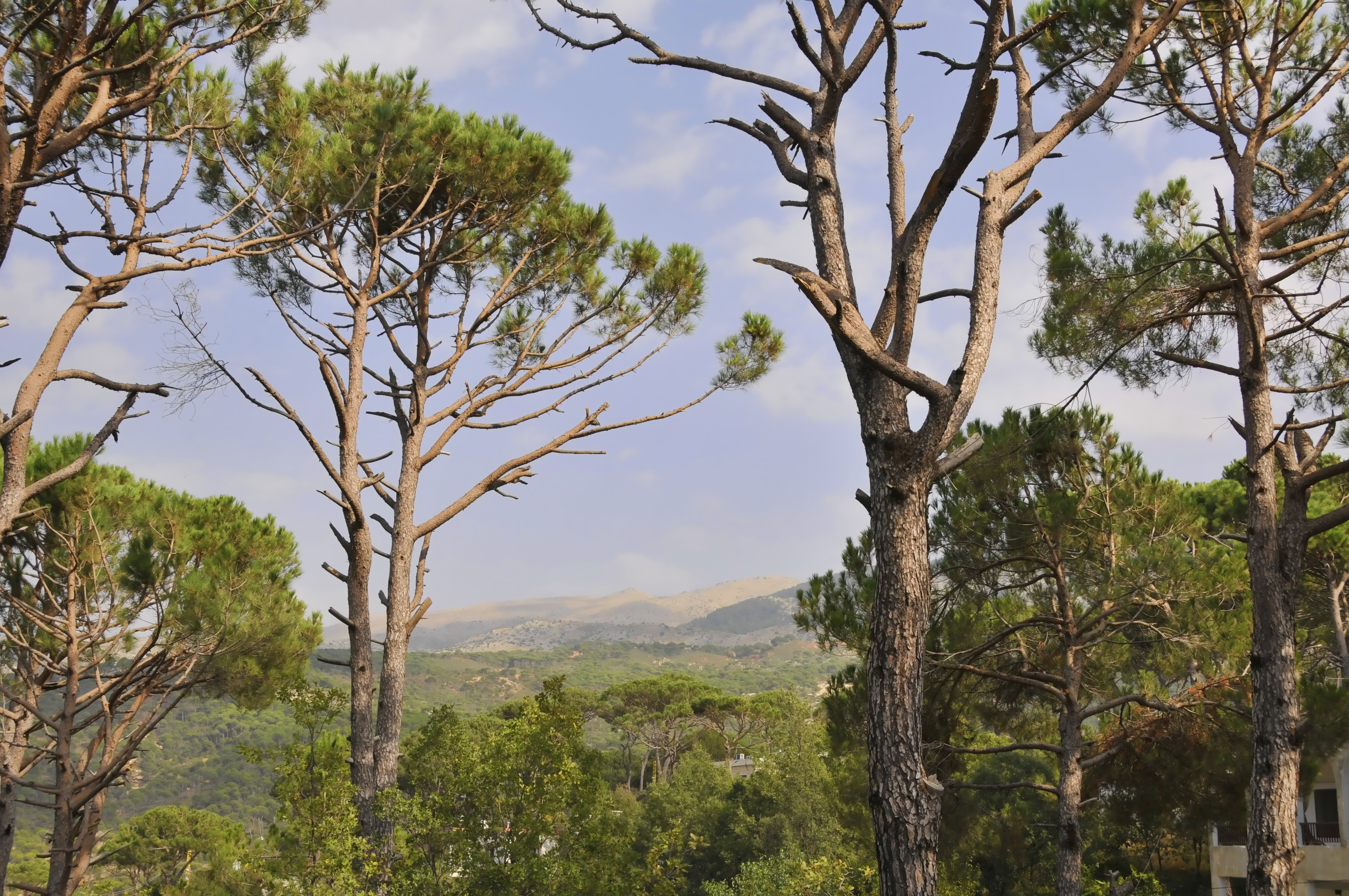
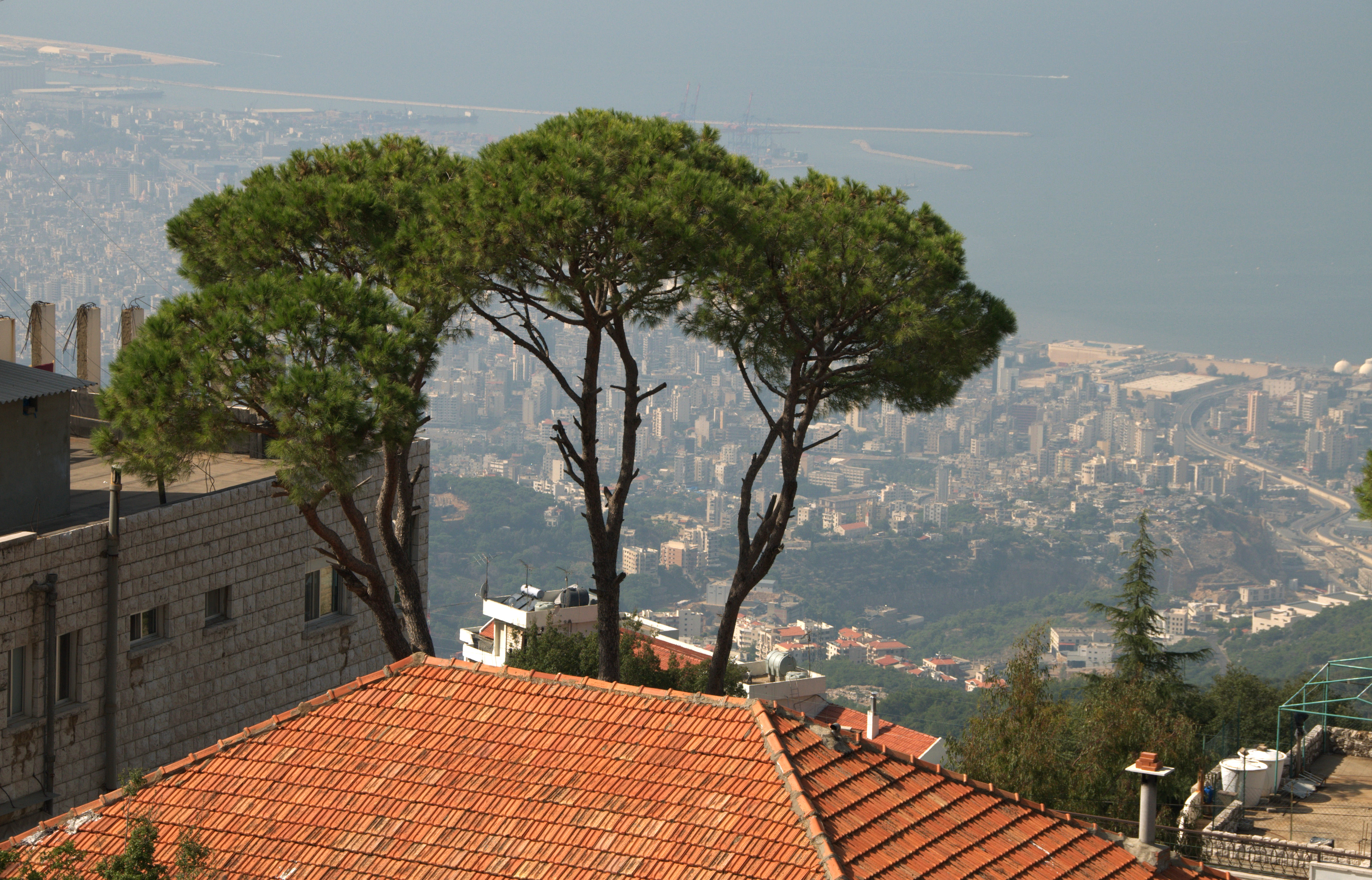
Pine trees in Mount Lebanon

Some mountain peasants raised pine trees, as these trees had a great economic benefit, and the richest mountain peasants were the ones who owned the pine forests, in addition to the fact that its fruit is expensive, it provides the farmer with firewood and timber for the roof of his house, and wooden panels for his furniture and seats, and other things necessary for his life. Most of the pine was consumed locally, and very little of it was exported.

As for wheat, spelt, and grains, their production was very weak in the lands of the Mutasarrifate, due to the narrowness of the lands and the harsh climate, after the 1861 Protocol separated from Mount Lebanon the plains of Akkar, the Bekaa and the south, the mountain's production of wheat has become so small that it only fills a very small part of the people's need for this basic material in their daily diet. Therefore, they had to buy wheat from Houran, Dara'a and other areas to secure their essential sustenance. Dr. Anis Freiha, one of the Lebanese historians who lived through the era of the Mutasarrifate, talks about the necessity of wheat in the Mount Lebanon Mutasarrifate, he mentions the presence of wheat sellers coming from the Bekaa, Hauran and Jabal al-Druze to Lebanon: "Bread is the basic food item... So the first thing the villager took care of was the wheat supply... In every Lebanese village, few people produce their own wheat. But most of them buy wheat from abroad... Those who do not produce their own wheat are accepted [by the wheat sellers] and buy what is sufficient for them for at least half a year. And some of them do not have their heart reassured until they buy for a whole year. But some of them can't."

=== Industry and commerce ===
The industry in the Mount Lebanon Mutasarrifate was primitive and backward, confined to villages for local consumption. Almost every home had a loom to sew what they needed from the fabric. With the exception of the oil, soap and silk industries, there was no advanced industry in Lebanon that could provide for the needs of the population. It was necessary for the people to import basic commodities such as sugar, rice, medicine, clothing, household appliances, machinery and other modern manufactures. Since the ports were outside the borders of the Mutasarrifate, trade flourished far from the mountain, and with the advancement of sea and land transportation, European goods began to flow into these ports. The arrival of European machinery-made goods led to the weakening and demise of the local handicraft, and only the valuable fabrics that are made in the town of Zouk Mikael and a few other places remain, table covers, clothes, mattresses, curtains, and others are produced in these places.

In 1913, the Mutasarrif Ohannes Pasha tried to establish 3 commercial ports belonging to the Mutasarrifate to revive the movement of imports and exports, but the outbreak of the First World War a year later prevented that. And when the Ottoman Empire entered the war in October 1914, the economic situation in Lebanon deteriorated rapidly and dangerously, due to the Allied fleets striking a naval siege along the Ottoman shores, including the Levantine coast, preventing ships from entering or leaving, thus halting export and import work, thus, the movement of imports and exports died. Trade, local markets emptied of foreign goods, prices skyrocketed, and it was not possible for the poor and the middle-class segment of the population to secure their essential needs. With the interruption of Marine Transportation, the money from expatriates to their families was interrupted. As some families lived on the financial aid they received from the countries of expatriation, they became in a deplorable state of destitution and poverty. The interruption of this important financial resource affected the general economic situation in Lebanon, which led to the intensification and complexity of the economic crisis.

=== Currency ===
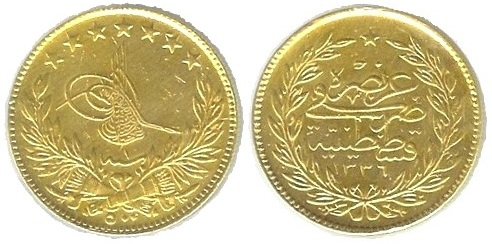
Ottoman lira

The Lebanese have been dealing with the Ottoman currency since the beginning of the Mutasarrifate era, and they called it el-lirah el-osmeliyyeh or osmeliyyeh for short, and the Ottoman lira was minted from gold and silver and divided into one hundred and sixty-two piasters. The population also dealt with the Egyptian currency, from which the money acquired the words maṣāri and miṣriyyāt (from the Arabic name for Egypt, Miṣr) which are still used in the Levant meaning "currency". The Turkish currency was also divided into a matleek (smallest Ottoman coin) and a bashlik, a matleek is minted from iron, copper or bronze, and a bashlik is a copper-bronze coin, which is equal to 10 matleeks or 3 piasters.

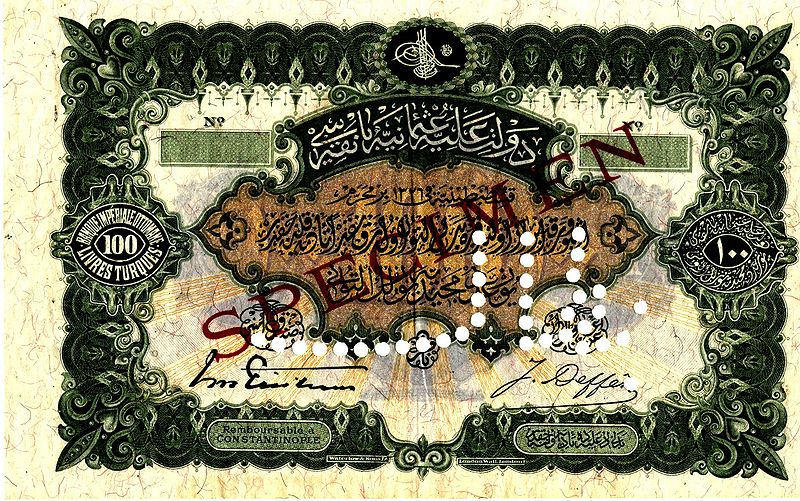
Ottoman Turkish 100 Lira Banknote

During World War I, the federal government issued paper money and forced the people to circulate it. This is because the Ottoman Empire spent huge sums on the war, which led to it being forced to issue banknotes for the first time in the country's history, and to increase the quantities that it brought to the market, so the value of this paper currency in relation to gold and silver money fell significantly, but the government was insisting on considering the paper lira as equal to the gold lira, and it used to force people to take it and deal with it. The country's catastrophe with this cash was double, as it lost part of the wealth of the Lebanese, and caused a stagnation in the movement of buying and selling, because people were evading its grip and preferred to keep what they had of goods and grain instead of selling them with papers issued by a state burdened with exorbitant war expenses. The financial crisis was made worse by the loss of small coins from people's hands, making it impossible for citizens to pay the values of business and small things, such as a porter's fare, or the price of a postage stamp, or an electric locomotive ticket, or anything else. Dr. George Hanna states:

"I had spent an entire night on the train with nothing to feed. When I got off at Daraa station, I met a seller of sesame Ka'aks, and I bought a Ka'ak from him for ten piasters. When I gave him the price of a banknote, he looked at me with the most contempt and threw the paper in my face, saying: “We do not take strips of papers… We do not issue letters with the post.” By this he means that the currency is only suitable for buying postage stamps. And since I did not have the coins, I was about to return the Ka'ak to the seller... However, the simple and generous seller refused to return it when he knew from my words that I am an Arab from Lebanon. He gave me the Ka'ak...He started insulting the Turks and the enemies of the Arabs, and praying to God to undermine the Ottoman Empire so that the Arabs could rid themselves of its rule, oppression, and colonization."

=== Economic situation during World War I ===
The economic situation in Mount Lebanon worsened during the First World War due to the measures taken by the Ottoman military authorities. At the beginning of the war, the leadership of the Fourth Army prevented the transfer of grain of all kinds to Mount Lebanon, and since the mountain did not produce enough grain and relied on the Bekaa, Hauran and its surroundings to secure its needs, the grains disappeared from the market and their prices skyrocketed, until the price of a pound of bread reached a golden lira, and the poor and middle-income population could not get it, and they began to die of hunger. People were enduring hardships and dangers in order to smuggle small quantities of wheat from Akkar, the Bekaa, or Hauran, in order to prevent the death of their families and loved ones, but the eyes of the observers were vigilant to prevent the smuggling of grain and punish the smugglers.

After many revisions and extensive deliberations, Jamal Pasha allowed a number of Beiruti notables to establish a company to import and distribute grain at moderate prices under the supervision of military leaders. At the beginning of 1917, the subsistence centers began their work in all Lebanese districts, giving two hundred and fifty grams of wheat to each person per day at the price of seven piasters per pound, while the price of a pound reached one hundred piasters on the black market. But the complicity of the military figures with the company's staff and the monopolists who sell wheat on the free black market, disrupted the catering business and made it useless. For example, they used various tricks and excuses to evade handing over the subsistence allowances to their owners, and when they had to deliver them, they covered the wheat with gravel, dirt, cornstarch and weeds.

== Society and culture ==
=== Demographics ===
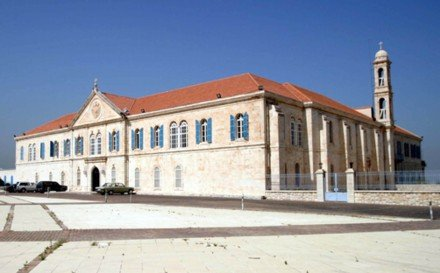
Seat of the Maronite Catholic Patriarchate of Antioch in Bkerké.

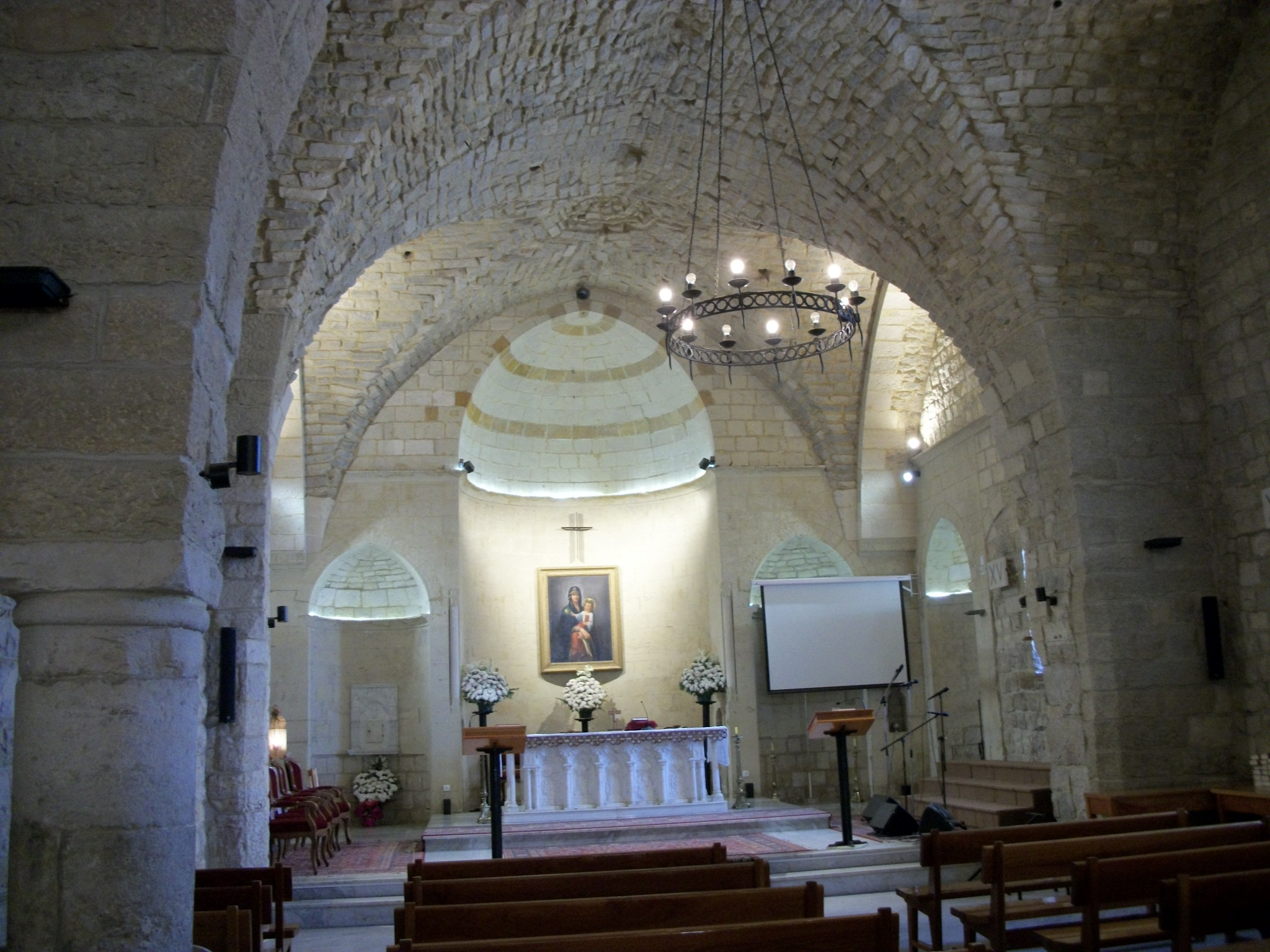
The Church of Saidet et Tallé in Deir al-Qamar, Lebanon.

Christians constituted the majority of the population of the Mutasarrifate of Mount Lebanon, and most of them belonged to the Syriac Maronite sect. The Maronites were concentrated in the region since they settled in northern Mount Lebanon, and during the era of the Mutasarrifate, the Maronites were spread in the north, i.e. in the districts of Kesrouan, Batroun, Koura, Zahle and in the Deir al-Qamar district, these areas are still inhabited today by a Maronite majority. As for the rest of the districts, the Maronites mixed with other Christian sects and with the Druze, who formed the second largest sect in the mountain, and the majority of the residents of the Chouf and the Matn aqdiyah. There was also a noticeable presence of the Greek Orthodox in both parts of the mountain. As for the Shiites and the Sunnis, their presence was, and still is, very insignificant. The Shiites spread in a few villages in the Matn and Kesrouan, and the Sunnis lived on the Chouf coast and in Zahle. As a result of this closeness and convergence, a number of Lebanese embraced the religion of their neighbors or their religious sect, and the alqāb became shared among Christians and Muslims. The ruling and social system in the Mount Lebanon Mutasarrifate was formed from the Maronite-Druze dualism, and the security stability and Druze-Maronite coexistence in the Mutasarrifate allowed the development of the economy and the system of government. The area of Bkerke has been the seat of the Maronite Patriarchal See since 1823, and it has continued so throughout the Mutasarrifate era until now. The word Bkerke in Arabic means "the place of keeping documents and books."

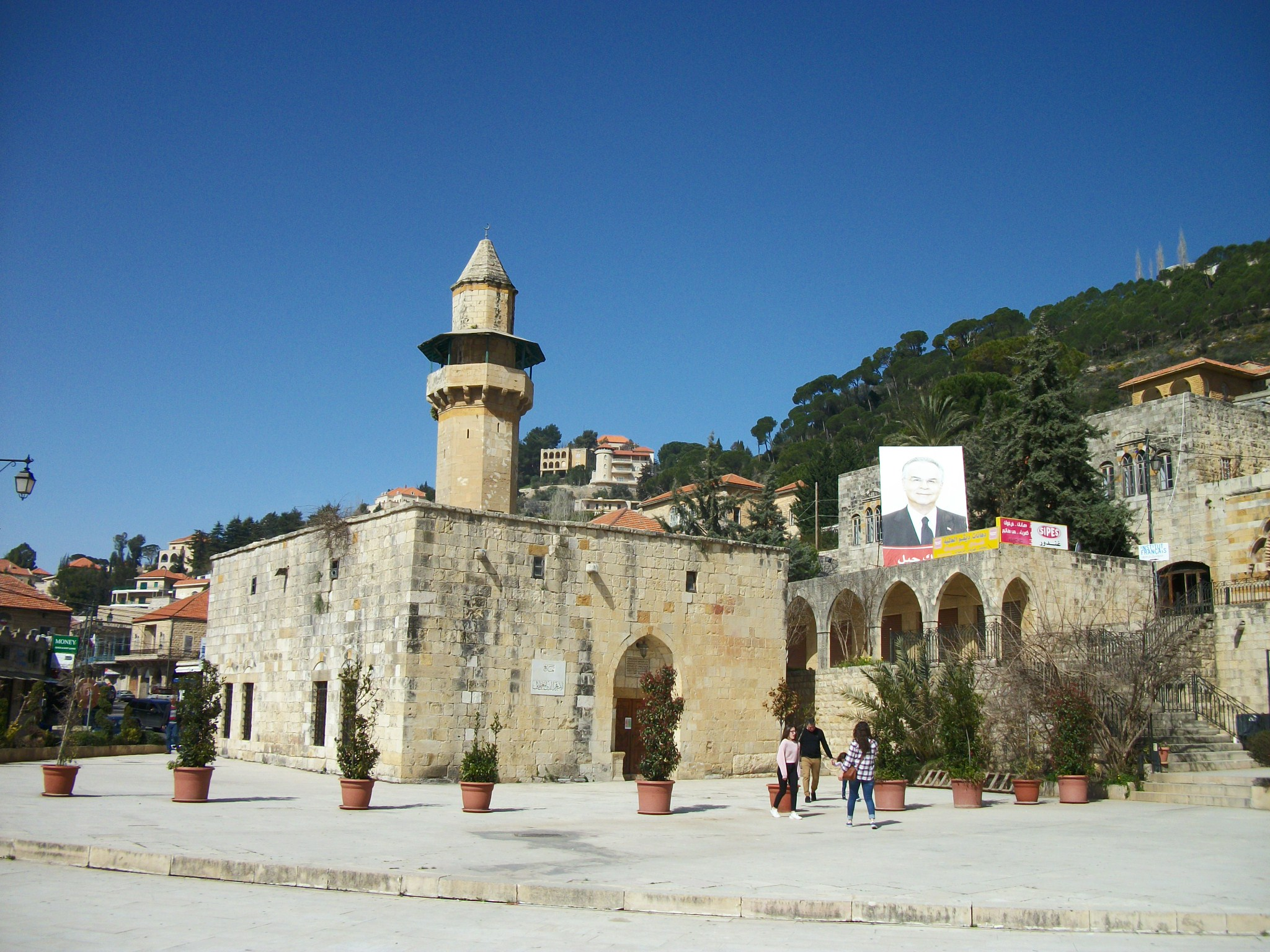
The Fakhreddine Mosque, the oldest mosque in Mount Lebanon, built in 1493 by Fakhr al-Din I.

Under the Mutasarrifate, the Shiites enjoyed stability, and security after a long period of constant persecutions and forced migrations, as they were given several rights. They also had two members in the Lebanese council, and had members in all the courts, and bodies affiliated to the Mutasarrifate. Notable Shias of the Mutasarrifate include: Sayyid Ali al-Husseini (a Qādi in Baabda and Jounieh), Shiite Keserwani members who held the position of membership of the board of directors: Sheikh Abbas Melhem Hamadeh, Abdullah Berro, Hajj Kazem Amr, Sheikh Hassan Awad, Sheikh Hassan Hamadar, Ali Hajj Hammoud, Muhammad Effendi Muhsin Abi Haidar, and Hajj Ali Muslim Amr.

==== 1895 official estimate and 1913 census ====
Religion in Mount Lebanon Mutasarrifate (1913 census)
1. Catholicism (66.1%)
2. Greek Orthodoxy (12.6%)
3. Other Christians (0.69%)
4. Druze (11.4%)
5. Shiism (5.65%)
6. Sunnism (3.50%)

The total population of Mount Lebanon Mutasarrifate in 1895 was estimated as 399,530, with 319,296 (79.92%) Christians, 49,812 (12.47%) Druze and 30,422 (7.61%) Muslims. In 1913, the total population was enumerated as 414,747, with 329,482 (79.44%) Christians, 47,290 (11.40%) Druze and 37,741 (9.15%) Muslims.

Religion in Mount Lebanon according to official estimates and censuses
Religion		1895 estimate		1913 census	
Religion		#	%	#	%
Christians
Roman Catholic	Maronite	229,680	57.49%	242,308	58.42%
Roman Catholic	Melkite	34,472	8.63%	31,936	7.70%
Roman Catholic	Total	264,152	66.12%	274,244	66.12%
Greek Orthodox		54,208	13.57%	52,356	12.62%
Other Christians		936	0.23%	2,882	0.69%
Total Christians		319,296	79.92%	329,482	79.44%
Druze
Druze		49,812	12.47%	47,290	11.40%
Muslims
Shiite		16,846	4.22%	23,413	5.65%
Sunni		13,576	3.40%	14,529	3.50%
Total Muslims		30,422	7.61%	37,942	9.15%
Total population		399,530	100%	414,747	100%

=== Language ===
The Arabic language was the language spoken daily among the population, and the Mount Lebanon dialect was grafted with many Syriac words, due to the prevalence of that language among them in the past. The Syriac language continued to be a liturgical language only used in the Maronite religious hymns. In Bsharri and the neighboring villages in the north of the mountain, the Syriac language remained the language of communication in the nineteenth century; Despite its decline in power, the Syriac language remained the official language of the Church and the language of its rituals and liturgical books. During that time, the Karshuni script was still used, which is the Arabic language written in Syriac letters, as most Maronites, although they had mastered the Arabic language, were not yet proficient in it. The liturgical books and the Bible, permitted to be used liturgically, continued to be issued only in the Syriac language until the beginning of the twentieth century. As for the Turkish language, it was widespread in government departments and official institutions, and it was spoken by the intellectuals of the Mutasarrifate, usually in addition to the French language.

=== Social conditions ===
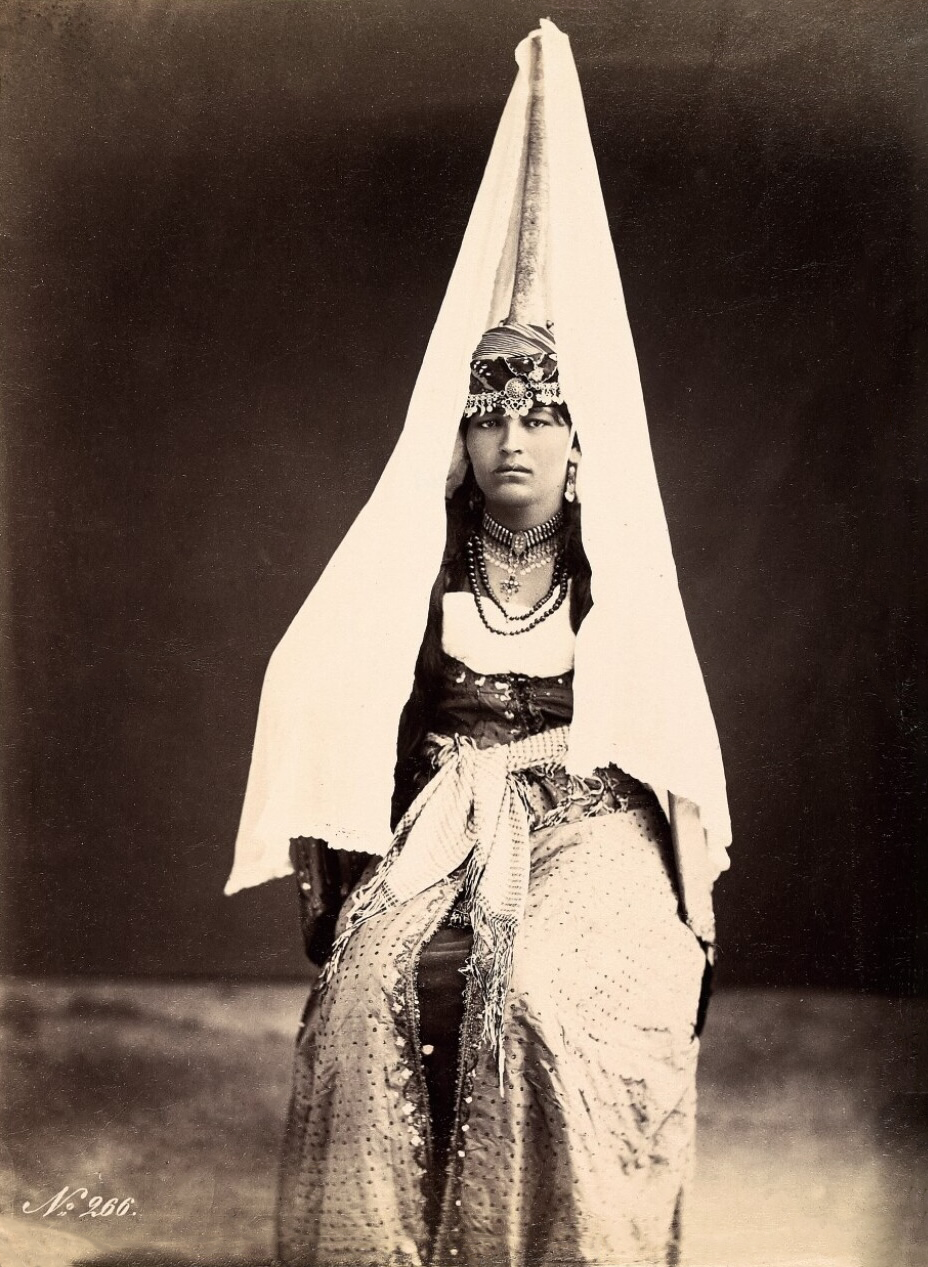
Tantour on a Druze woman in Chouf, Lebanon – 1870s. It is the traditional women's dress in Lebanon. This costume was no longer common in the coastal towns of Lebanon after 1840, and had become extinct in the mountain by the late 19th century.

In the early nineteenth century, Western visitor would see scenes in Lebanon of a distinctive local character in the fashion of men and women, and in the style of furniture, the types of food, and the types of customs and traditions. The nineteenth century did not end until many of these manifestations changed, especially in the major cities, and Westernization and European ways began to impact the lives of the Lebanese and change their culture in clothing, food and furniture in a way that further made them different from the neighboring Arab nations. The era of the Mutasarrifate was characterized by the migration of the mountaineers from villages to cities, so the cities grew and became large and vast, and the prosperity of the cities helped the emergence of a new third class in Lebanese society, after people were two classes: the class of princes, feudal lords and senior clerics, and the class of workers and peasants, in the cities there appeared a middle class of merchants, doctors, lawyers, teachers, and other professions.

The Lebanese family had undergone significant changes in its lifestyle. The large family was a cohesive social unit, in which all members were included in a large house, from the grandfather to the married sons to their young children. Everyone owed obedience and loyalty to the grandfather as if he was a tribal sheikh, and considered him the "blessing of the family," the grandfather and the head of the family had an important and prominent opinion on sensitive issues such as marriage, divorce or separation, and he often had the final say. But the influence of European culture into Lebanon at the end of the nineteenth and early twentieth centuries made the individual feel that he is a being distinct and independent from other members of his family, especially the elderly. Thus, the Lebanese family bond began to disintegrate little by little, so the son who marries creates a new family life, independent of his mother and father, headed by him, and his brother leans towards him, so family independence led to the demise of the idea of holiness that was surrounded by the father, and leads to a weak sense of obedience and respect for adults.

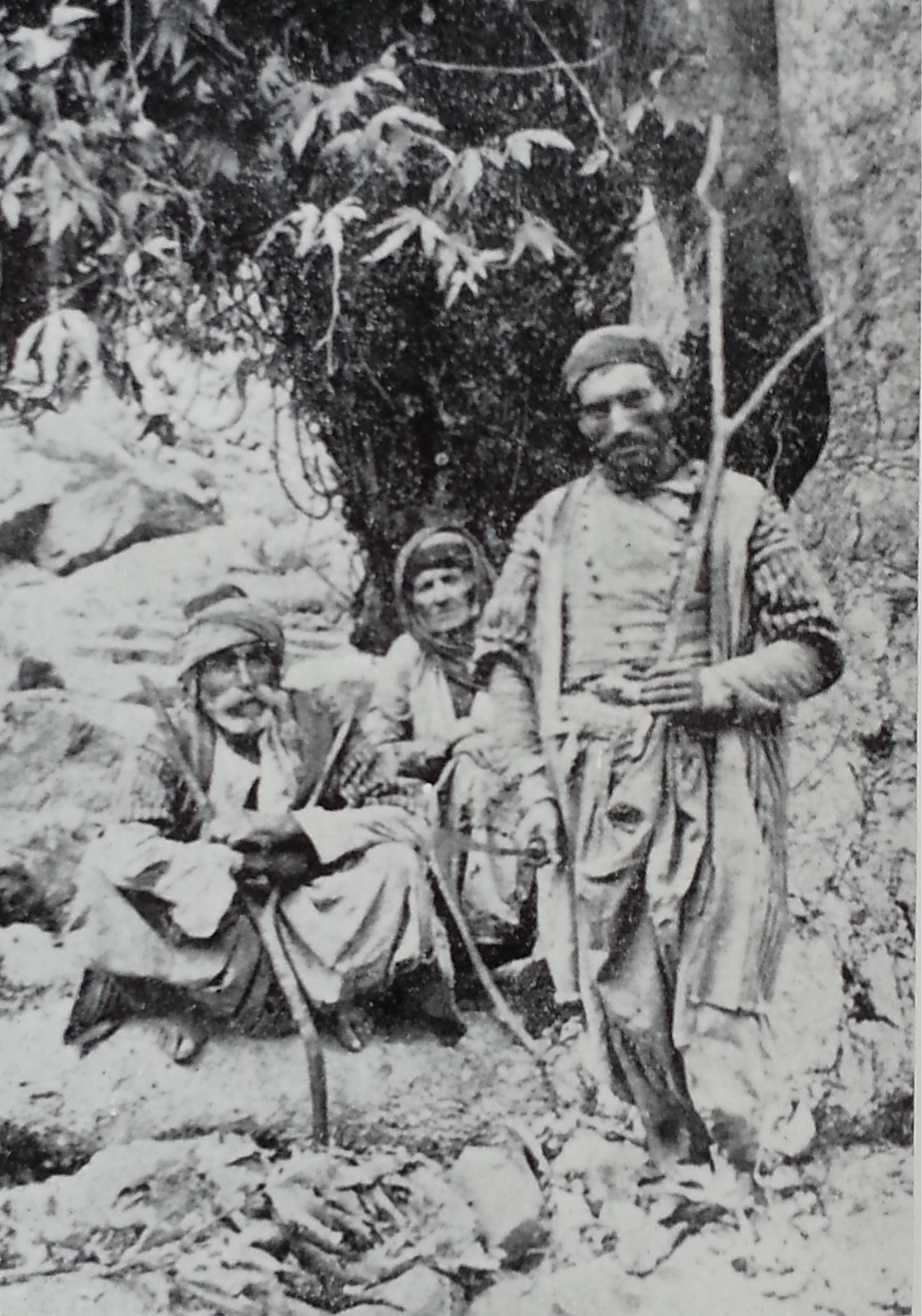
Lebanese Villagers of the Mount Lebanon Mutasarrifate

The First World War further widened the social inequalities among the Lebanese, because its conditions enabled the rich to become richer, and made the poor poorer. Some of the rich people approached the senior military officers and rulers, who were able to be contacted by them, they befriended them, accompanied them, held luxurious parties and generous banquets for them, and gave them precious gifts. The Ottoman military rewarded the rich for these services, regardless of their violations, and left them to monopolize the necessary goods and make sustenance harder to guarantee, creating a black market in which prices rise exorbitantly, and which guarantees them an abundant profit. Indeed, most of those high-ranking officers were partners of the Lebanese monopolists and were responsible, like them, of the distress that the people suffered. And when the supplies decreased and the hunger intensified, and death by disaster began to become a norm, many of the middle-income people were forced to sell their lands, and homes, and the most expensive things they owned at the lowest prices to buy wheat from the black market and keep the risk of starvation away from them and their children and relatives. Some of these people lived until the end of the war only to find themselves poor and destitute, only to see that the rich had multiplied their wealth by extracting money, land and real estate from them.

=== Construction and transportation ===
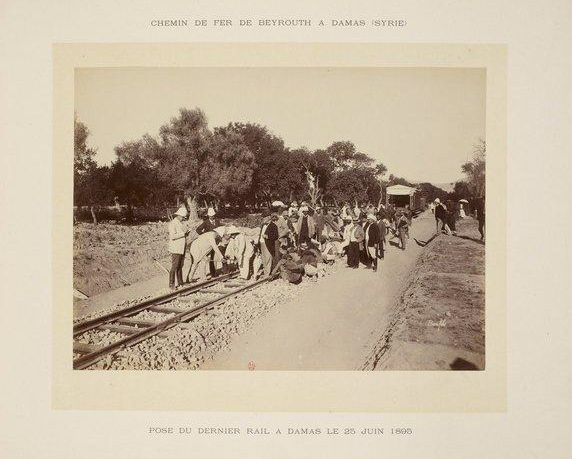
Laying the last rail of the Beirut–Damascus line on 25 June 1895. By this time, the railway had become known as the Damascus–Hama and Extensions (DHP).

During the period of the Mutasarrifate, many urban works were carried out, perhaps the most important of which was the construction of palaces and the construction of transportation routes that were built between villages and cities. In the year 1863 a French company completed the construction of the carriage road between Beirut and Damascus, and from this main road, secondary roads branched north and south that linked the villages to each other. And the construction of the Beirut-Tripoli road, and Beirut-Sidon on the coast took place during the reign of the Mutasarrif Naoum Pasha. During the Mutasarrifate era, the Iron Company completed its railway between Beirut and Damascus (1895), Rayak and Aleppo (1902), and Tripoli and Homs (1912). During this era, the port of Beirut was repaired and prepared to receive large ships. However, all these projects were unable to solve the economic crisis faced by the poor in Lebanon, who are the majority of the population.

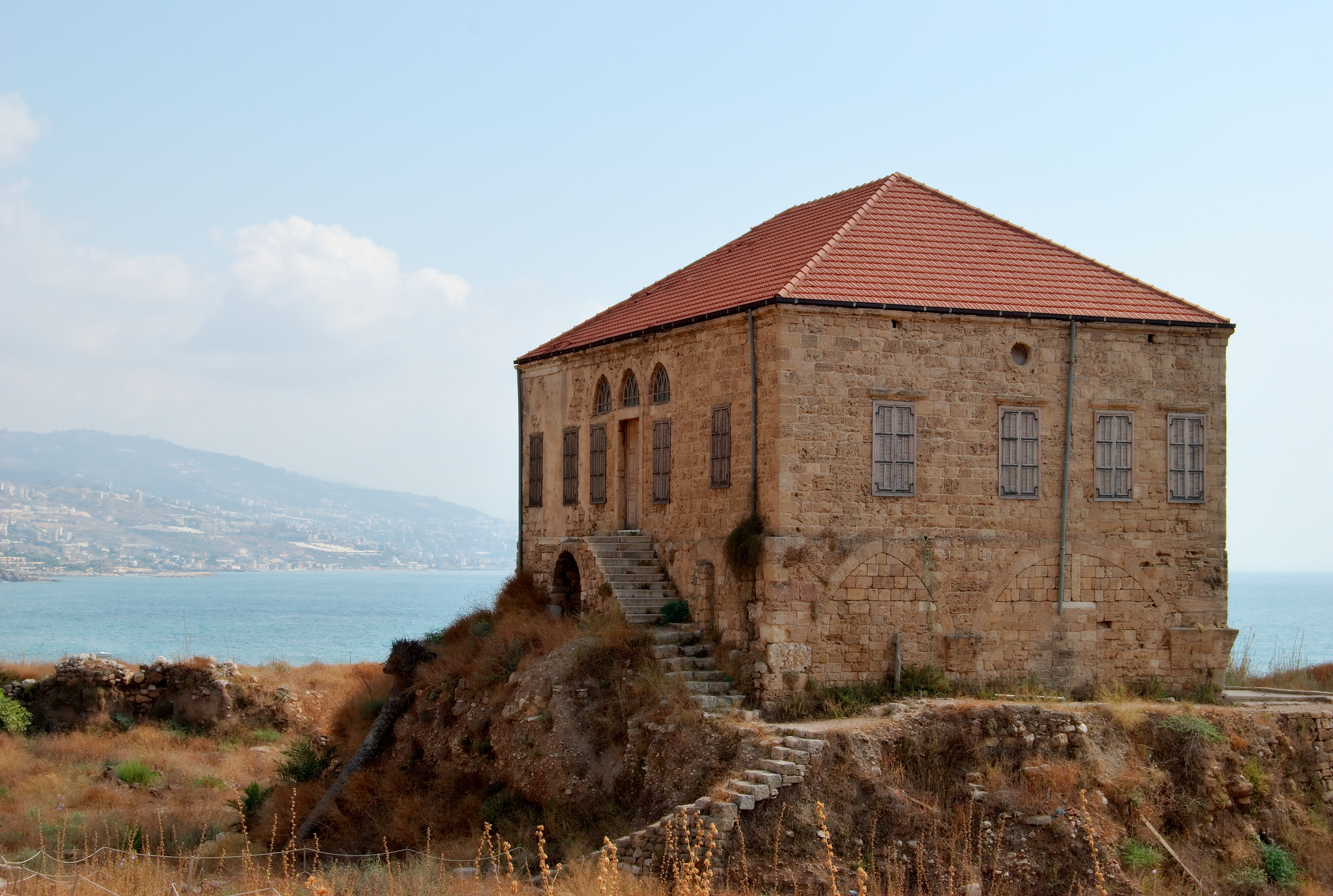
Traditional Lebanese house

As for the typical houses that were inhabited by the common people, they differed in shape and material, some of them were built out of stone, marble, tiles, red bricks, and others were made of mud. The rich and middle class Lebanese lived in houses of two floors: the upper floor was the attic, which is the formal room of the guest, and in many cases it was the ordinary dwelling in which the family always inhabited. As for the ground or second floor, it is the basement, and in it the peasants used to shelter their animals, put farming tools, and store firewood and animal fodder.

=== Culture and heritage ===
The folklore of the Mutasarrifate of Mount Lebanon continued to be the same as the traditional Lebanese folklore until the present era, and it is a common folklore in many respects with the rest of the Levant, Turkey, Cyprus and Greece, and is unique to Lebanon in other respects. One of the most prominent forms of Lebanese folklore is the popular dance known as the "dabkeh". This dance is often practiced at festivals, celebrations, and weddings. The dabkeh ensemble consists of a group of no less than ten people called the dabbīkeh and of an arghul player or the shebbabeh and the tabla. The dancers line up in either a row, an arc, or a circle. The dancers are male or female, and the dances are performed either together or separately. The dance is led by the first dancer, who generally determines the direction of the dance, and usually performs additional movements to demonstrate his skill. The dabkeh is a movement of the legs and is characterized by loud hitting on the ground. There are many types of dabkeh, which differ according to the region from which the dancers come.

Among the other aspects of folklore is the Lebanese village singing, which is a singing of a special nature, including what is known as "Mijānā" (a type of Zajal) or "Ataaba", and these two folk singing types are the two types of purely Lebanese singing and the most common among villagers, these are verses from colloquial poetry that are recited in the Lebanese dialect and usually sing of a distant lover, the motherland, or longing. The word mījānā comes from the Aramaic root "najn", meaning melody and singing. The Mijana verses are based on the principle of the stanza, and someone from the village who had a melodious voice used to recite them, they called such poets "Qawwal", and the people of the village were proud of their abilities. The village qawwal was invited to weddings and feasts in other villages, so he would go with his "hawzah", that is, his disciples and companions, who would repeat his verses and applaud him with admiration and encouragement. Often, poetry reciting matches were played between two or more qawwals, and this custom is still in force in the villages of Lebanon until the present time.

Among the Lebanese folklore traditions that were prevalent in the Mutasarrifate, and have disappeared today, or have only survived in some remote villages, are those customs related to marriage and childbearing. Intermarriage between one family and another has been an issue under consideration for a long time, especially among conservative Christian and Islamic circles. Families claiming honor and lineage, or those enjoying a religious position, did not marry except to "Al-Mjewīz", and the Mjewīz are the families who did not see any objection to giving them their daughters in marriage, or marrying their sons off to their daughters. In many cases, the elders and sheikhs of the family agreed to marry the son to the girl when they reached the age of maturity. The villagers held two parties on the night of the wedding: a party for men and a party for women, and on the day of the wedding a “incapacitation party” was held, which consisted in the bride's family asking the groom himself to perform physical actions that demonstrate his manhood and the strength of his body in the bride's house, or in the village square, and among these incapacitating actions is to raise a heavy stone jar with one or two hands, depending on the agreement, above his head with his arm outstretched, or to lift a heavy crowbar to pluck stones. Many men had nicknames before their marriage, and then called their male children the nickname that was given to them before marriage, and this custom still exists in Lebanon, for example: Elias is nicknamed Abu Nassif, Salim is nicknamed Abu Najib, Jurays is nicknamed Abu Assaf, and Hassan is nicknamed Abu Ali or Abu Yusuf, and Daoud is nicknamed Abu Suleiman, and Ibrahim is nicknamed Abu Ismail, and so on.

=== Al-Nahda ===
After Lebanon went through a long period of intellectual stagnation, in the nineteenth century there was an apparent activity in various sciences and literature, and the era of the Mutasarrifate witnessed a literary renaissance whose main causes were the following factors:

- Contact with the West: Lebanon's proximity to the sea and its ancient connection with the West had a great impact on creating its modern renaissance. The digging of the Suez Canal in 1869, and the rapid development that followed in the use of railways, steam ships, and cars, connected the East and the West, and restored the region to its traditional role as a natural bridge where peoples meet and civilizations interact. This contact prompted Lebanon steadily on the way to progress.
- Foreign missions: The foreign missions that came to Lebanon for religious purposes had a far-reaching impact on the development of intellectual life. The missionaries saw that the best way to spread their religious doctrines was to establish schools. They founded dozens of primary schools and a number of secondary schools. American missionaries established the “Syrian Evangelical College” in 1866, which later became the American University of Beirut, and the Jesuits founded Saint Joseph University in 1874. In addition to these schools, the American and Jesuit missionaries had two printing houses in Beirut. These schools and printing presses had a great advantage in spreading knowledge and advancing intellectual life in Lebanon.

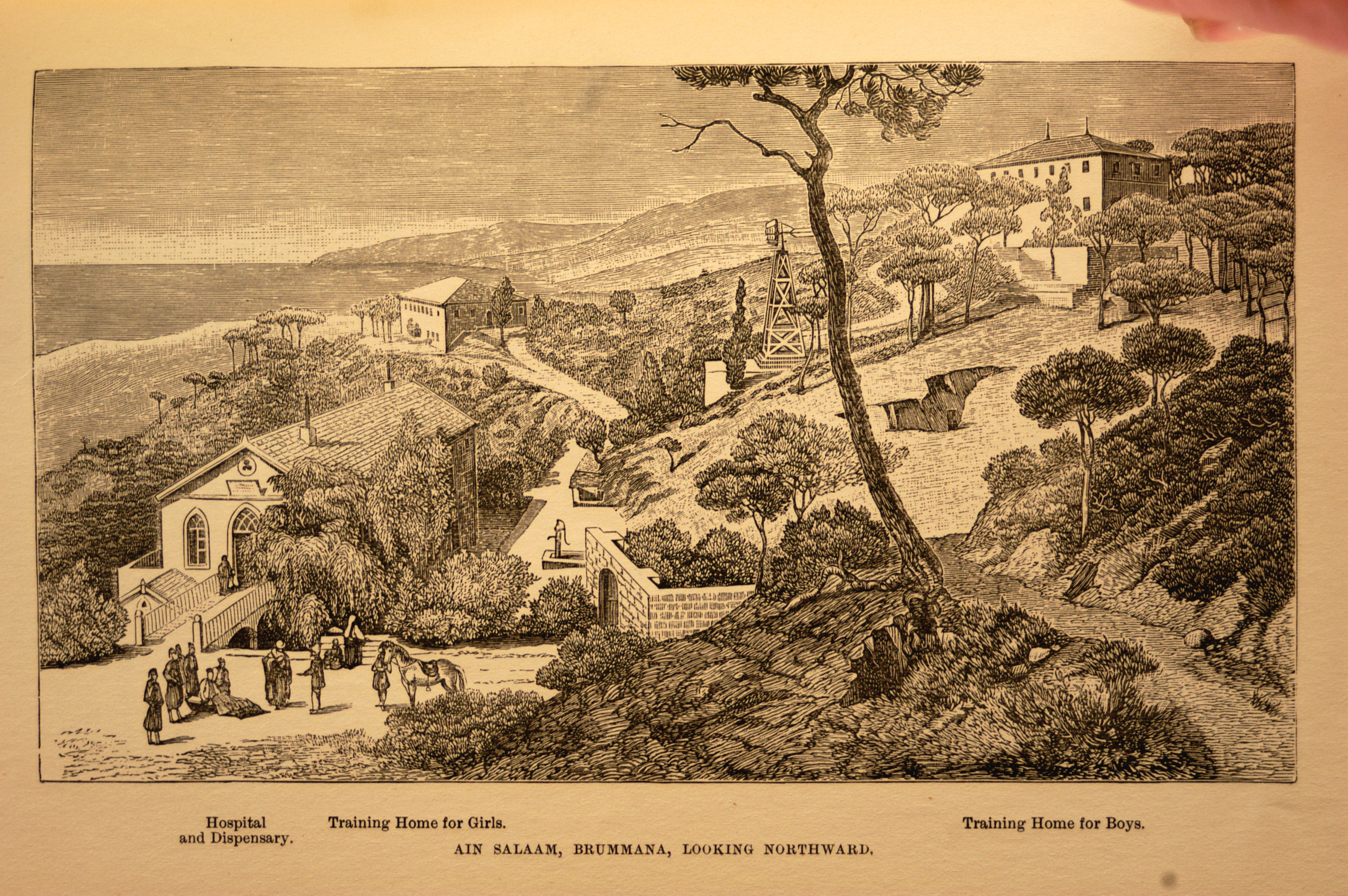
Brummana High School around 1890. One of the oldest schools in Lebanon, it was founded by a Swiss mission, and several famous Arab and Lebanese personalities studied there.

- Missions: This cultural activity, which was led by Western missionaries, was accompanied by the establishment of scientific missions to specialize outside the country. The American missionaries sent Anthony Al-Amiouni, Abdullah Azār and Ismail Jumblatt to London to gain further knowledge. Then four students went to the Kasr Al-Aini Institute in Egypt to specialize in medicine. The Mutasarrif Franco Nasri Pasha sent some of the Mutasarrif's youth to Europe to complete their higher studies. Then the missions abroad multiplied, and returned to contribute to the dissemination of science and culture in Lebanon.
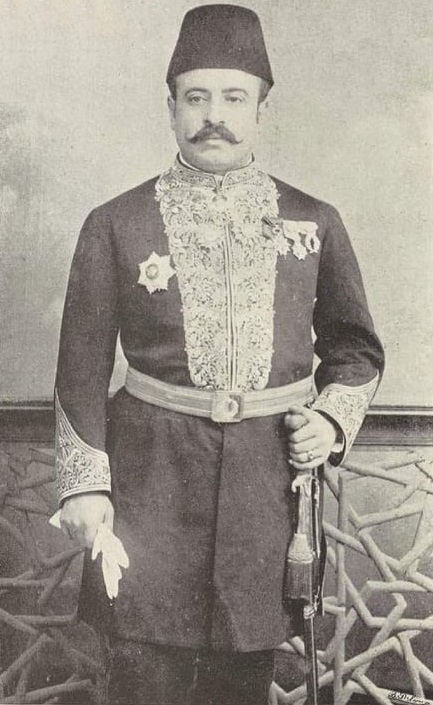
  Beshara Taqla
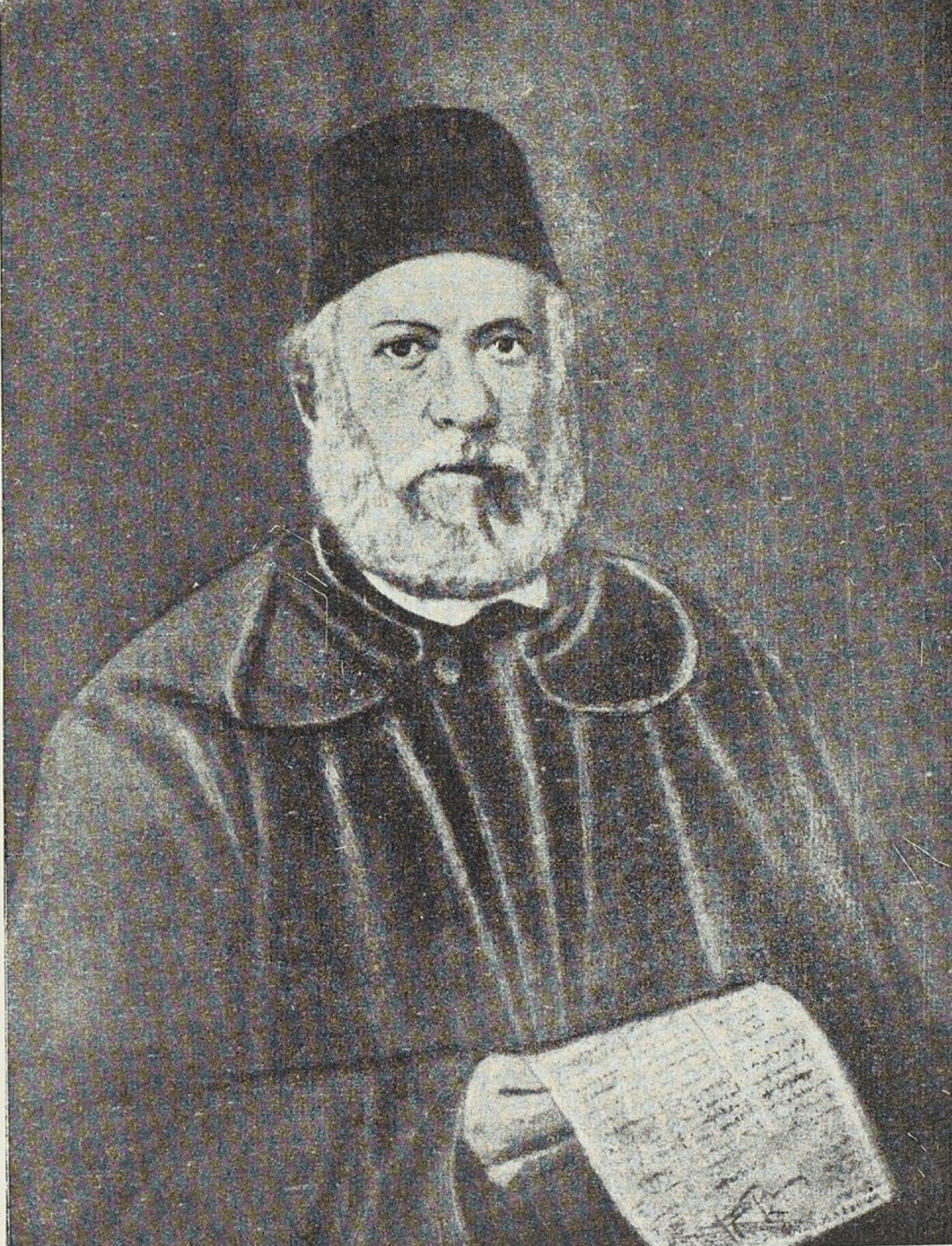
  Ahmad Faris al-Shidyaq
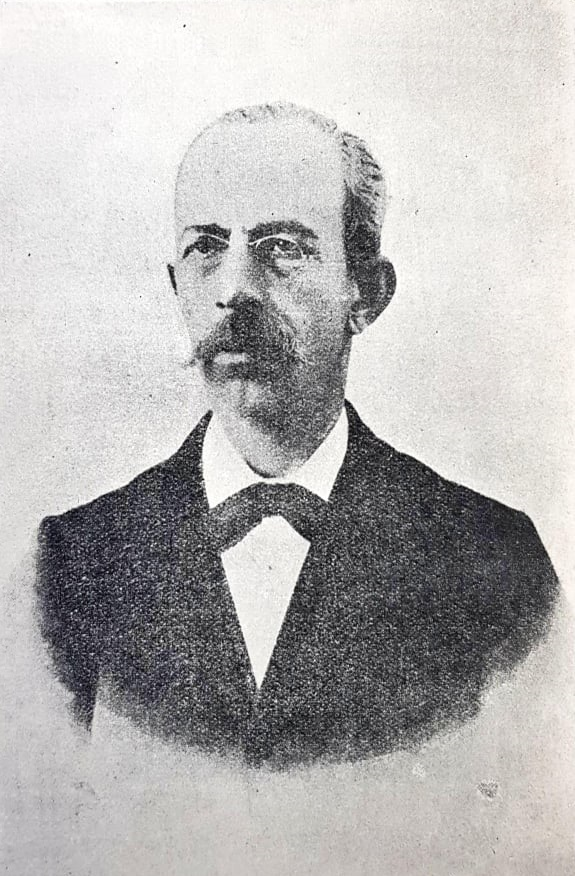
  Ibrahim Al-Yazigi

The literary and scientific renaissance during the Mutasarrifate era was manifested in a number of ways, the most important of which was: the establishment of national schools. The establishment of foreign schools was an incentive for patriots and rulers to establish national schools, and to revive and strengthen old schools. Among the most famous schools that were established in Beirut during this era were the Patriarchal School in 1865, the Thalāth Aqmār School in 1866, and the Hikma School in 1872, then the Zahrat Al Ihsan School for Girls and the Daoudia School in Aabey. And all these schools are still thriving until now. It was not long before there was a national or foreign school in every large Mutasarrifate village, and Beirut became the richest city in the Arab East in the number of schools. Although Beirut was outside the borders of the Mutasarrifate, a large part of its students were from the children of the Mutasarrifate. These schools have played their part in spreading knowledge in Lebanon and neighboring countries.

During the Mutasarrifate era, printing presses spread throughout Mount Lebanon, after they were limited to the Shwer and Deir Qozhaya printing presses. A printing press was established in Beiteddine and another in Deir al-Qamar. Soon the printing presses spread to the various regions of the Mutasarrifate, such as Baabda, Jounieh, Aley, Aabey, Hammana, Batroun, Jbeil, Harissa and Zahle. The large number of printing presses indicates the spread of the means of writing culture, and their distribution in different parts of the country indicates that attention to the causes of the culture was not limited to cities only, but also included district centers and some small villages as well.

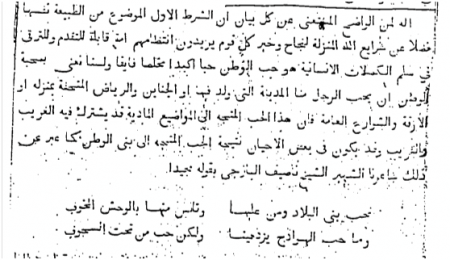
Hadiqat al-Akhbar

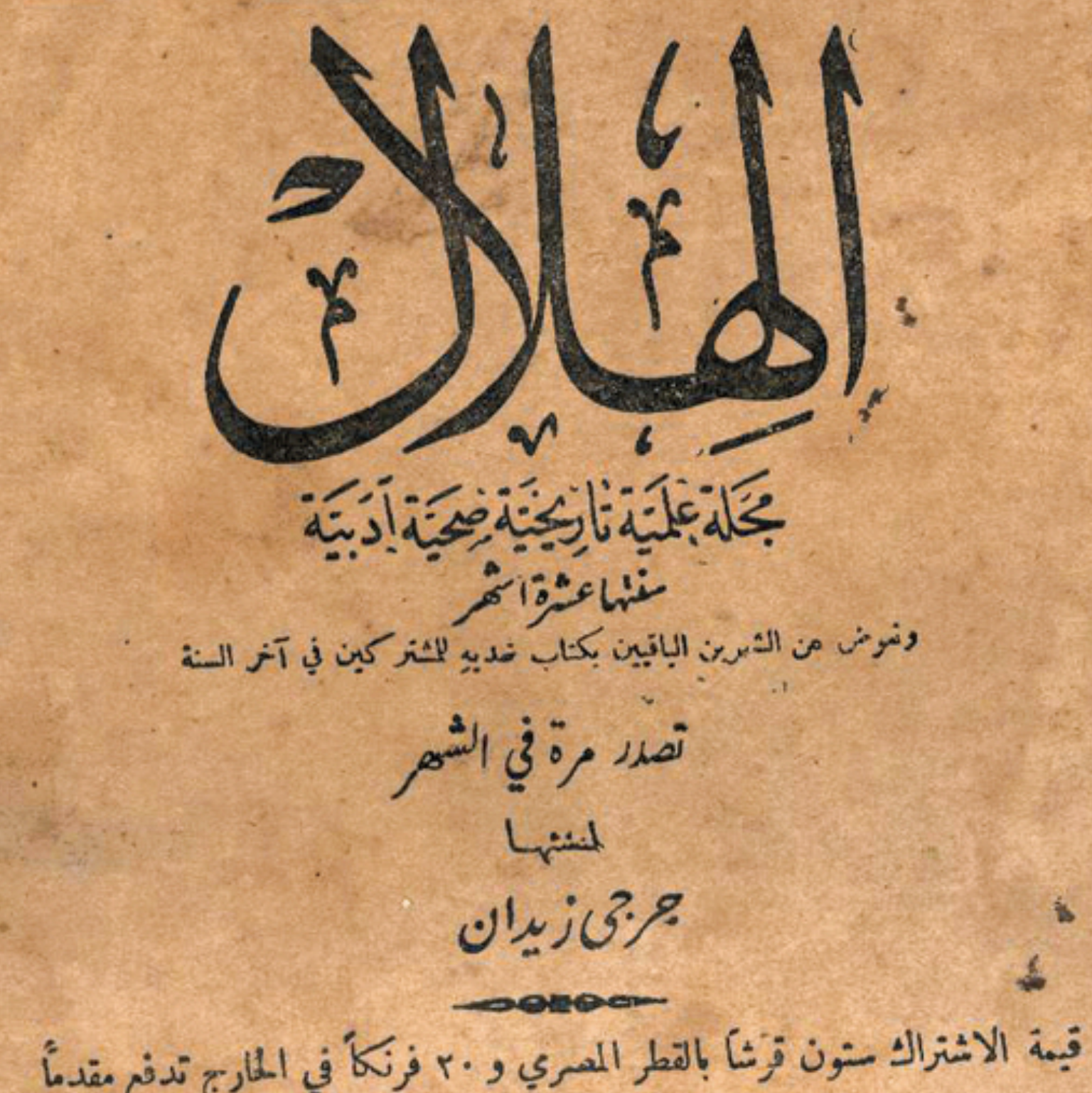
Al-Hilal

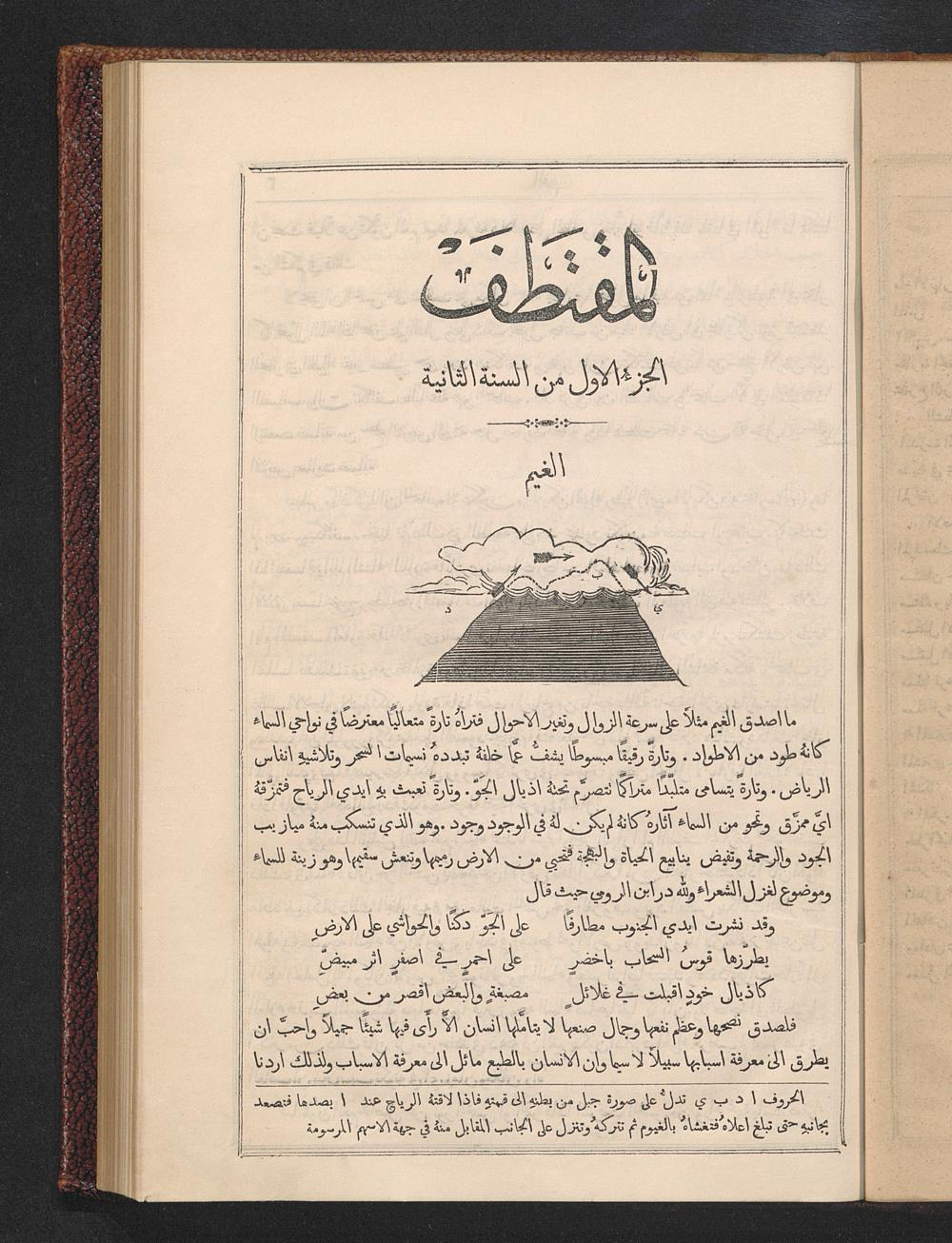
Al-Muqtataf

Lebanon took the lead in the world of journalism. During the period of the Mutasarrifate, a large number of newspapers and magazines were published, the most famous of which were: Hadiqat al-Akhbar (1858), "Lubnān" newspaper, which appeared in 1867 by order of Daoud Pasha, the newspaper Al-Bashir of the Jesuits in 1870, and "Al-Jnayneh" by Butrus al-Bustani in 1871, and "Thamrāt Al-Funūn" by Abdel Qader Al-Qabbani in 1875, "Lisan Al-Hāl" newspaper by Khalil Sarkis in 1877, and "Bayrūt" newspaper by Muhammad Al-Dana in 1886. This is in addition to the Lebanese press that appeared and flourished outside Lebanon, especially in Egypt, such as Al-Ahram newspaper by Salim and Bshara Takla in 1875, "Al-Muqtataf" in 1876, Masr newspaper by Adeeb Ishaq in 1877, Al-Muqattam newspaper by Yaqoub Sarrouf and Faris Nimr in 1889, Al-Hilal magazine by Jurji Zaidan in 1892, and Al-Dia’ by Ibrahim Al-Yazji in 1898. The Arab press was one of the most important manifestations of the Nahda and the causes of advancement and progress.

Among the manifestations of the cultural renaissance was also the emergence of literary societies, the most famous of which were the Jam'iyyat Al-'Ulūm, which was headed by Prince Muhammad Arslan, the Islamic Charitable Maqāsed Society, which was established in Beirut by Midhat Pasha, the Wali of Syria in 1880, the Eastern Scientific Academy headed by Dr. Van dyke, and the Zahrat Al-Adab Society headed by Adib Ishaq. Another manifestation of the cultural renaissance is the emergence of a number of prominent writers and scholars who have emerged in various fields, including: the field of language and literature; Sheikh Nassif Al-Yazji, Abdullah Al-Bustani, Sheikh Yusef Al-Asir, and Ahmed Faris Al-Shidyaq. In the field of history, Bishop Youssef Al-Debs. In the field of scientific authorship, John Wortabet, the author of the two books "Principles of Anatomy" and "The Industry of the Surgeon," and Dr. Amin Gemayel, the author of the book "The Health." And the teacher Boutros Al-Bustani, the publisher of the "Encyclopedia of Knowledge" and the author of the dictionary of "Muhīt Al-Muhīt".

== Lebanese exodus ==
=== Reasons for emigration ===
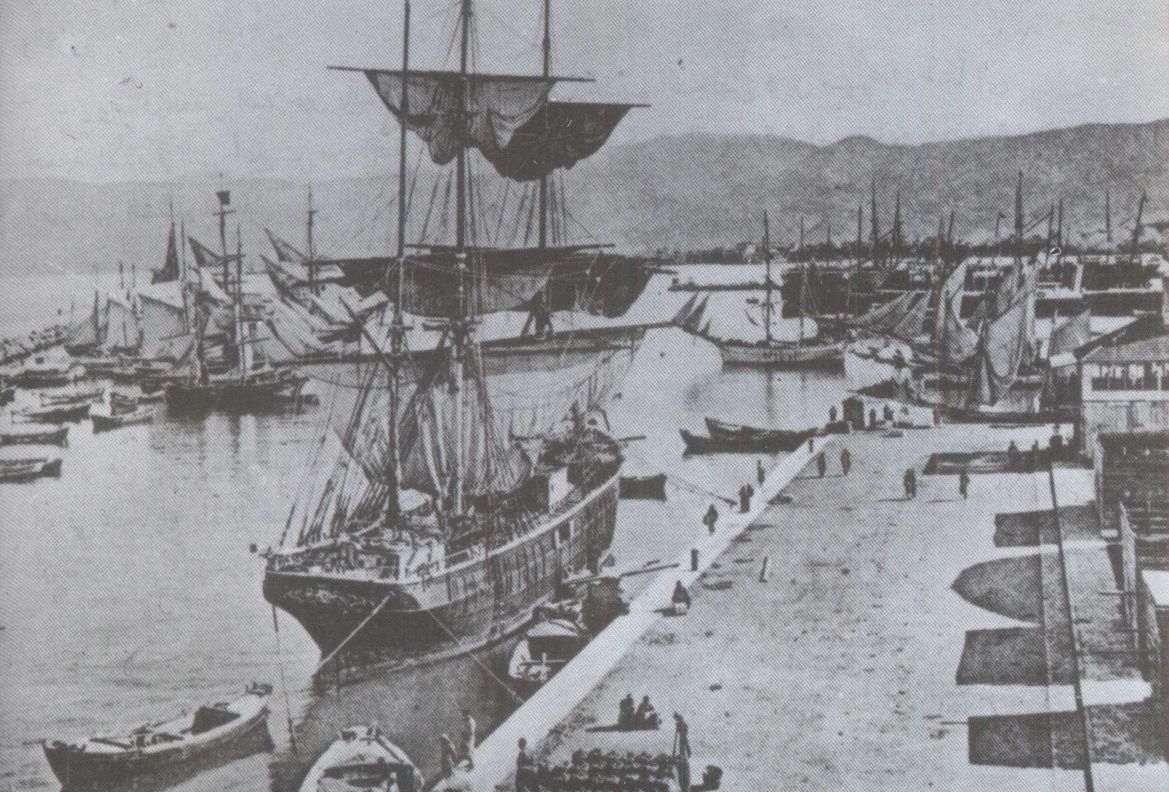
Beirut port in the era of the Mutasarrifate: from here, citizens left the country

After the country was hit by a number of bloody strifes in the middle of the nineteenth century, and after Mount Lebanon became a small Mutasarrifate with limited production, the doors of livelihood narrowed in the faces of a large number of unemployed youth, so they searched for a way out to save them from what they were suffering from poverty and destitution. Some peasants were growing tired of the taxes that were imposed on them, so a group of them got rid of it by resorting to protecting the monasteries that were exempted from taxes, so the Mutasarrifate government was obliged to distribute the total required taxes to the rest of the peasants who owned the remaining lands, so they fell under the weight of these taxes and waited for the opportunity to be given to them to take this weight off their shoulders.

While the Lebanese were suffering under the impact of poverty and destitution, it wasn't until news spread on the advanced economy of the countries abroad, in which they could realize their ambitions in a short time, that they thought of emigrating outside. The Ottoman government did not pursue its citizens only to collect taxes from them, but sometimes it pursued the presence of those citizens themselves in the empire, especially during the reign of Sultan Abdul Hamid II, when the state had become very weak and European interference in its affairs intensified, and some countries wooed Ottoman subjects who served their interests, the Ottomans pursued and persecuted all those whom they suspected of tending to the Europeans or supporting them, and some of these suspects were caught working for France, Britain or Russia, while others were found innocent, and both groups found immigration the best way to get rid of the pressure of the Ottomans.

Global transportation was slow, dangerous, and expensive until the mid-nineteenth century, when steamships replaced sailing ships, railways were developed in most countries, and cars have begun to replace transportation animals. As a result of this progress, the movement of travel between different countries increased as its dangers and expenses decreased while its speed increased. At the forefront of the beneficiaries of this development was the young population of Mount Lebanon during the era of the Mutasarrifate, who were encouraged to travel and began to migrate after being provided with modern means of transportation.

=== Migrants ===
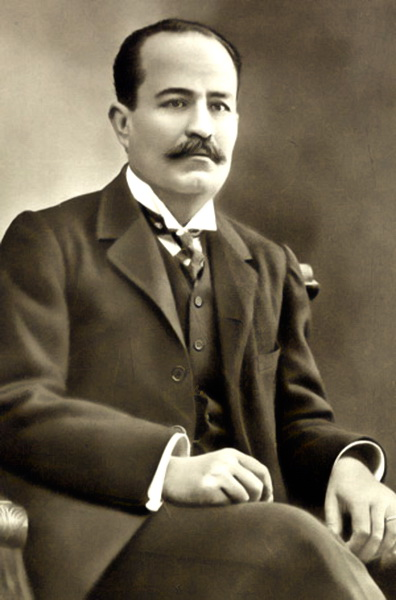
Jurji Zaydan

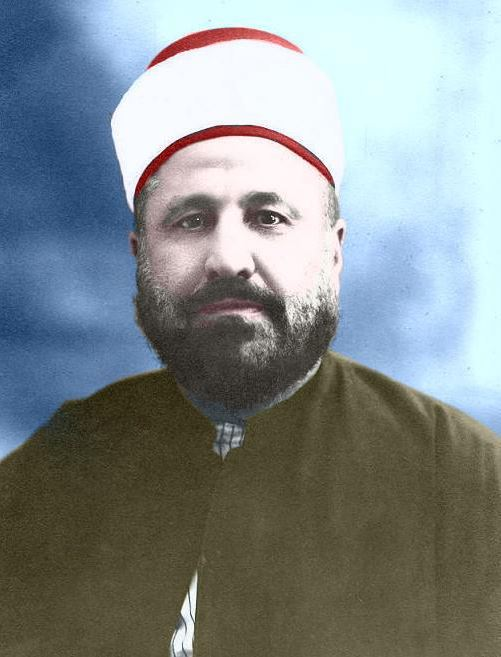
Rashid Rida

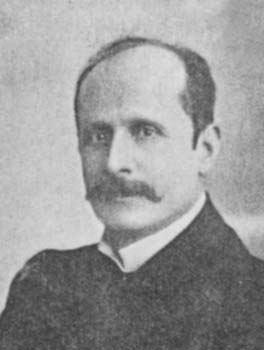
Yaqub Sarruf

Following the events of 1860, a large number of the Druze migrated to Hauran and Jabal al-Arab and settled there. In 1869, the Suez Canal was opened, shortening the road between Europe and the countries of the Ottoman Arab East. When Britain occupied Egypt in 1882, security prevailed and trade flourished greatly, so Lebanese immigrants came to the region, either to escape the oppression of the feudal lords and governors, or to seek livelihood. Many of them have succeeded, amassing huge fortunes and occupying prominent positions in administration, journalism and commerce. Among the most prominent settlers in Egypt were Salim and Bishara Taqla, Yaqoub Sarouf and Faris Nimr, sheikh Rashid Rida, and Jurji Zaidan.

After Egypt, Lebanese immigrants headed to North and South American countries such as the United States, Canada, Mexico, Brazil and Argentina. The news about the fertility of the soil and richness of life in the New World and Australia was spread, expanded and magnified, to the Arab East, tempting people and pushing them to migrate. It is said that the first of these was a young man from the village of Salima named Antoine Al-Busha'lāni, who landed in Boston in 1854, and died in New York two years later. In commemoration of his 100th anniversary, the Lebanese government considered 1955 the year of expatriates, so it received their delegations in that year and held large festivals in their honour. The Lebanese writer Mikhail Naimy talks about immigration during the Mutasarrifate era during the year 1900 and how it tore his family apart:

"In the fall of that year, the news of the death of my eldest uncle Ibrahim came to us from Egypt. His death was a disaster... for my mother, who... was so saddened that she neglected herself, her home, and her children, including her infant child. And the drunkness goes and the contemplation comes. Died who had died...And the mulberry orchard in the village will not produce silk that fills the family treasury with pennies. Where is the exit? – America! With a heavy heart, my mother makes the decision to send my brother Adib to the United States...His father had traveled before him and had not succeeded. Perhaps he will be more fortunate than his father... Perhaps he will return after years to pull the family from the bottom to the top, as some of the sons of Baskinta did. My father reluctantly acquiesces... But the problem of the "Nāwlūn" remains – the air ticket. It was about twenty gold pounds. My father owes the sum from my uncle Suleiman... My brother Adib, upon the blessings of God, travels with a group of Baskinta's sons and daughters, and he is the youngest of them."

In the era of the Mutasarrifate, the number of Lebanese immigrants to Australia and the New World began to increase steadily, and their money continued to flow to their families, so immigration became a highly talked-about topic among the people in the mountain villages. It is narrated that the cordwainer "Faddūl Mitrī Bshāra" immigrated from the town of Shweir to Brazil around the year 1885. No sooner had two years passed since his emigration until he sent to his father in Lebanon fifty pounds in gold. His father was given the money sent to him, so he bought broadcloth pants, a precious overcoat, and a cashmere shawl, and started strutting in the Shweir market. The town was shocked and eighty people rushed to America in one year and traveled at once. It is said that, between 1900 and 1915, 100,000 citizens left Mount Lebanon, a number that amounted to a quarter of the total population at the time.

=== Results of the migration ===
Migration had several positive and negative consequences on Mount Lebanon. Many of the immigrants achieved what they wanted from their immigration, with many of them striking it rich while living abroad. As a result, money flowed to residents from their expatriate children and relatives. Many families lived on remittances from foreign countries. Thus, the lives of some groups improved, and they were able to establish industrial, commercial and agricultural projects with the money their children earned, benefitting Lebanon's economy. Naturally, the abundant money would not have reached Lebanon if these immigrants had not achieved for themselves a great wealth and a prestigious position in the countries to which they immigrated, as many Lebanese people have attained a high position in the social and economic fields and have occupied great positions in the administration, the judiciary, the army and politics.

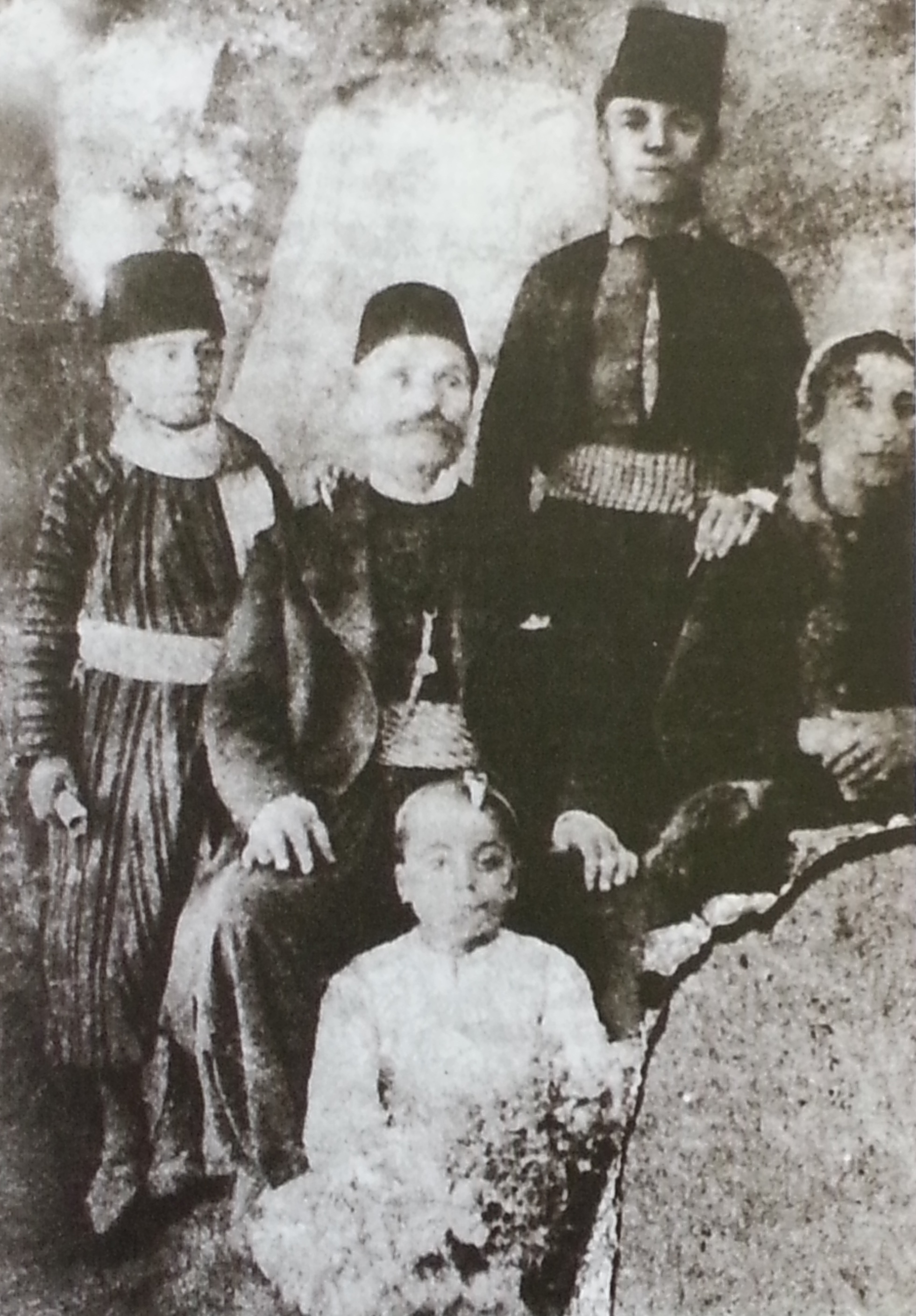
The family of Jibran Khalil Jibran, him being on the left, Mount Lebanon Mutasarrifate, 1880s.

The expatriate figures of literature had a great impact on the renaissance and development of Arabic literature. They developed a literary school of a special character of a mixture of inspiration from the East and the thought of the West. A large number of writers emerged in this field at the end of the period of the Mutasarrifate, including, for example: Gibran Khalil Gibran, Amin Rihani, Mikhail Naimy and Elia Abu Madi in the United States, and Khalil Mutran and Anton Gemayel in Egypt. However, this migratory literary school reached the peak of its glory after the Mutasarrifate era. Although emigration allowed a group of Mount Lebanon residents to occupy the highest positions and gain a great deal of success and wealth, the region was losing ambitious citizens as result and a youth capable of building and advancing their own homeland, rather than outside of it. Today, the number of Lebanese immigrants, whether recent immigrants or those of Lebanese descent, exceeds the number of Lebanese themselves.

== List of mutasarrifs ==
Eight mutasarrifs were appointed and ruled according to the basic mutasarrifate regulation that was issued in 1861 then modified by the 1864 reform. These were:

Period	Known name	Birth name	Confession / Religion	Notes
1861–1868	Davud Pasha	Garabet Artin Davoudian	Armenian Catholic	Ottoman Armenian from Istanbul
1868–1873	Franko Pasha	Nasrallah (Nasri) Franco Coussa	Melkite Greek Catholic	Syrian from Aleppo
1873–1883	Rüstem Pasha	Rüstem Mariani	Latin Catholic	Italian from Florence, naturalized Ottoman citizen
1883–1892	Wassa Pasha	Vaso Pashë Shkodrani	Albanian Greek Catholic	Albanian from Shkodër
1892–1902	Naoum Pasha	Naum Coussa	Melkite Greek Catholic	Syrian, stepson of second mutassarrif Nasri Franco Coussa (Franko Pasha)
1902–1907	Muzaffer Pasha	Ladislas Czaykowski	Latin Catholic	Polish
1907–1912	Yusuf Pasha	Youssef Coussa	Melkite Greek Catholic	Syrian, son of second mutassarrif Nasri Franco Coussa (Franko Pasha)
1912–1915	Ohannes Pasha	Ohannes Kouyoumdjian	Armenian Catholic	Ottoman Armenian

The mnemonic word "DaFRuWNaMYO" (in Arabic, دفرونميا) helped school children memorize the name of the mutasarrifs.

=== List of governors ===
When World War 1 broke out in 1914, Djemal Pasha occupied Mount Lebanon militarily and revoked the mutasarrifate system. He appointed the mutasarrifs during this period. Those governors were:

- Ali Münif Bey
- Ismail Bey
- Mümtaz Bey

== List of Administrative Council members ==
1861–1864 Administrative Council members:

Name	Confession / Religion
Hassan Abou Aouad	Unknown
Wehbeh Abou Ghanem	Druze
Abdallah Berro	Shia Muslim
Khalil El Jawish	Greek Orthodox
Ayyash Melhem Hamadeh	Unknown
Omar El Khatib	Sunni Muslim
Isaa Chedid El Khoury	Unknown
Hassan Choucair	Druze
Nasr El Sarraf	Unknown
Amoun Amoun	Maronite Catholic
Abdallah Moussallem	Melkite Catholic
Gebrail Mishaqa	Melkite Catholic

The 1861–1864 Administrative Council was later amended to include the following members:

Name	Confession / Religion	Notes
Hassan Abou Aouad	Unknown	
Wehbeh Abou Ghanem	Druze	
Youssef Abou Fadel	Greek Orthodox	Uncle of MP Mounir Abou Fadel
Omar El Khatib	Sunni Muslim	
Nakhleh Zalzal	Unknown	
Hassan Chehab	Sunni Muslim	
Ahmad Ali Abdel Samad	Druze	
Hassan Eid	Maronite Catholic	
Abdallah Moussallem	Melkite Catholic	
Nasr Nasr	Maronite Catholic	
Hassan Hamdar	Shia Muslim	
Mohammad Younes	Unknown	

1864–1869 Administrative Council members:

Name	Confession / Religion	Notes
Wehbeh Abou Ghanem	Druze	
Daher Abou Chacra	Druze	
Khalil El Jawish	Greek Orthodox	
Qowaider Hamadeh	Druze	He replaced Daher Abou Chacra due to his old age
Youssef El Khoury	Maronite Catholic	
Hassan Choucair	Druze	
Mohammad Arab	Sunni Muslim	
Amoun Amoun	Maronite Catholic	
Semaan Ghattas	Maronite Catholic	
Khalil Qartas	Greek Orthodox	
Abdallah Moussallem	Melkite Catholic	
Nasr Nasr	Maronite Catholic	
Hassan Hamdar	Shia Muslim	

== Divisions ==
Following the Basic Law, the Mount Lebanon Mutasarrifate was divided into seven districts (aqdiyah): Jezzine, Chouf, Matn, Kesrouan, Batroun, Koura and Zahle, in addition to two mudiriates (Hermel and Deir al-Qamar). The aqdiyah were divided into nawahi.

== Maps ==
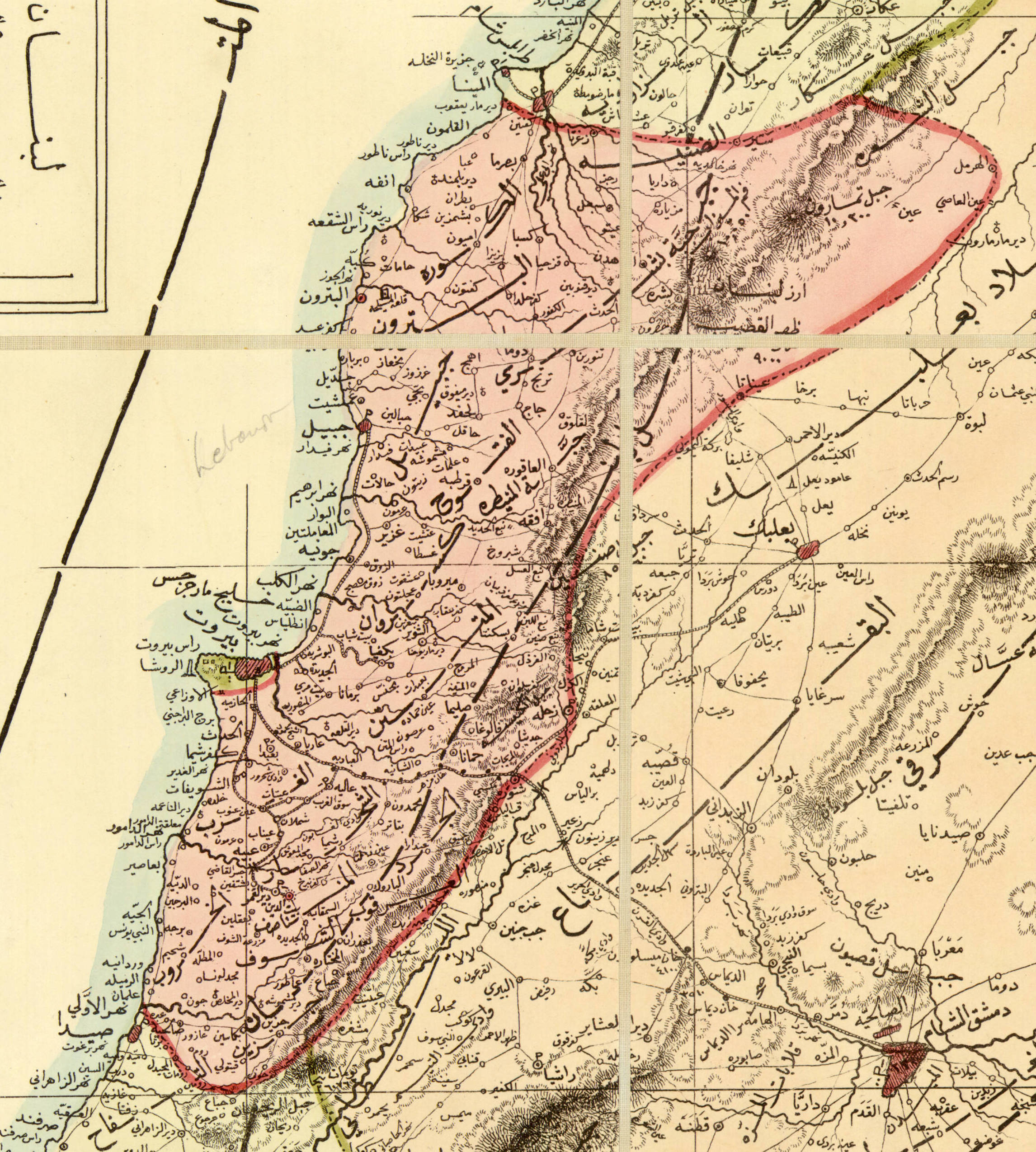
1889 map

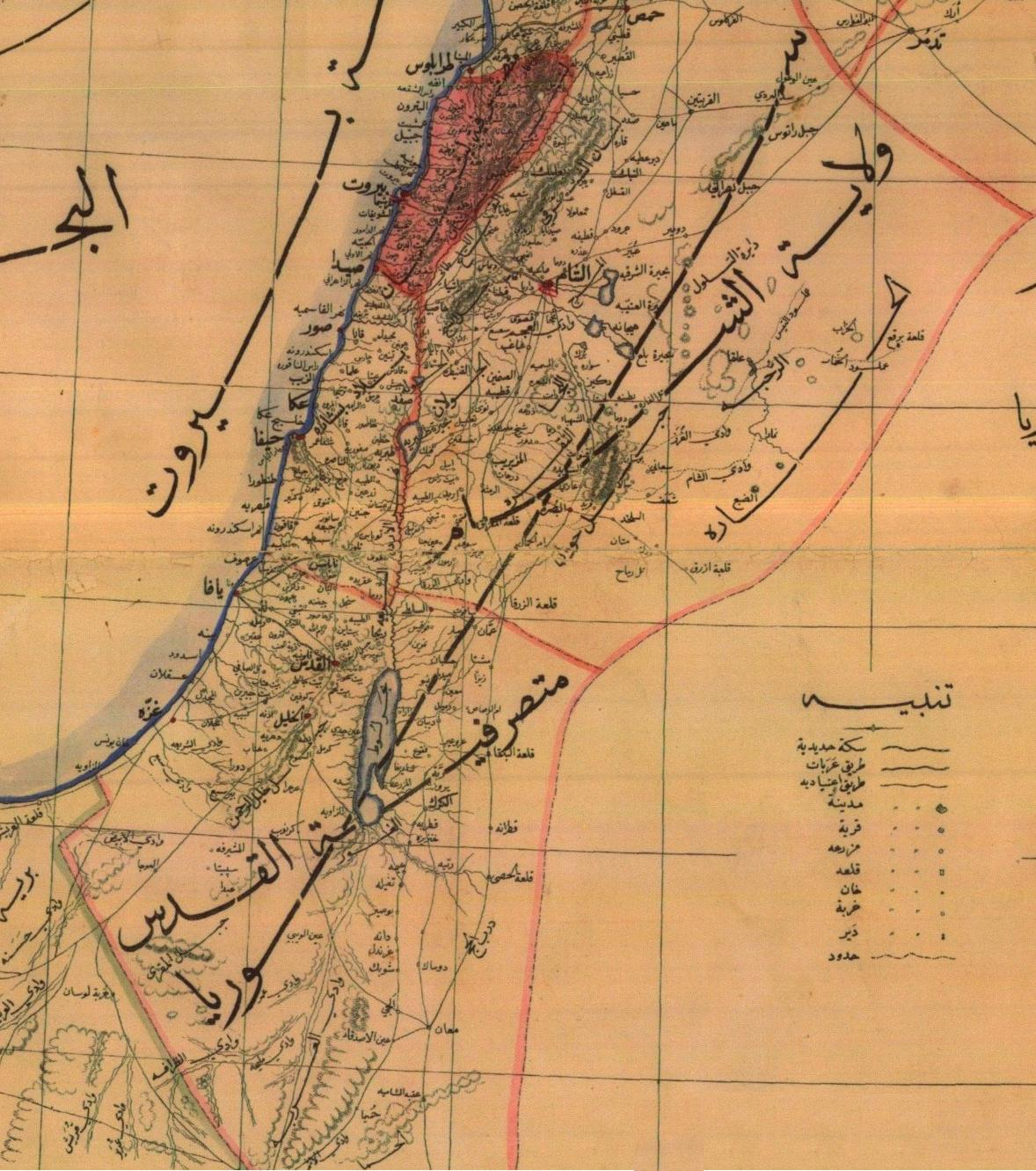
1893 map

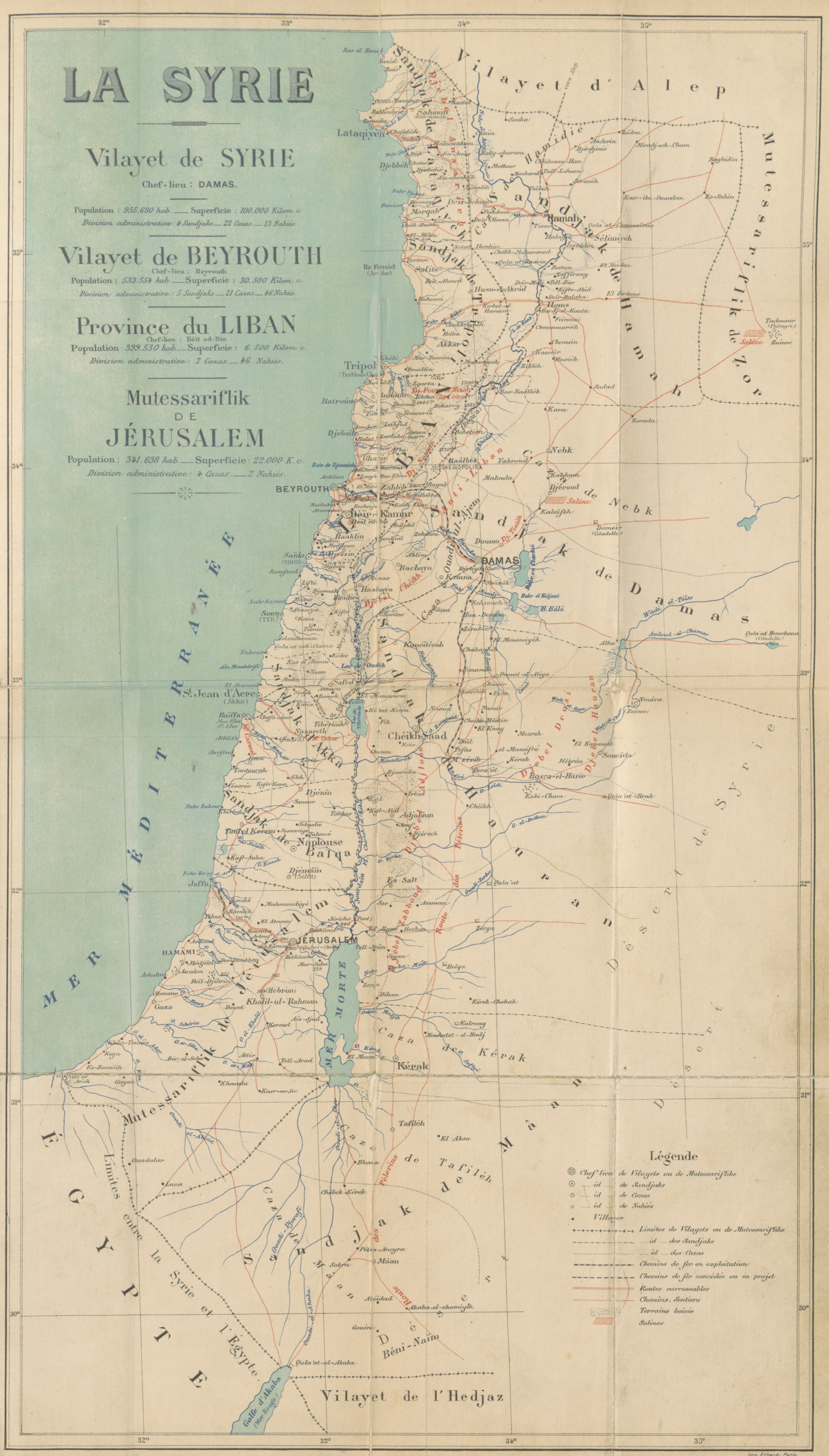
Vital Cuinet's 1896 map of the region of Syria, including the Mount Lebanon Mutasarrifate.

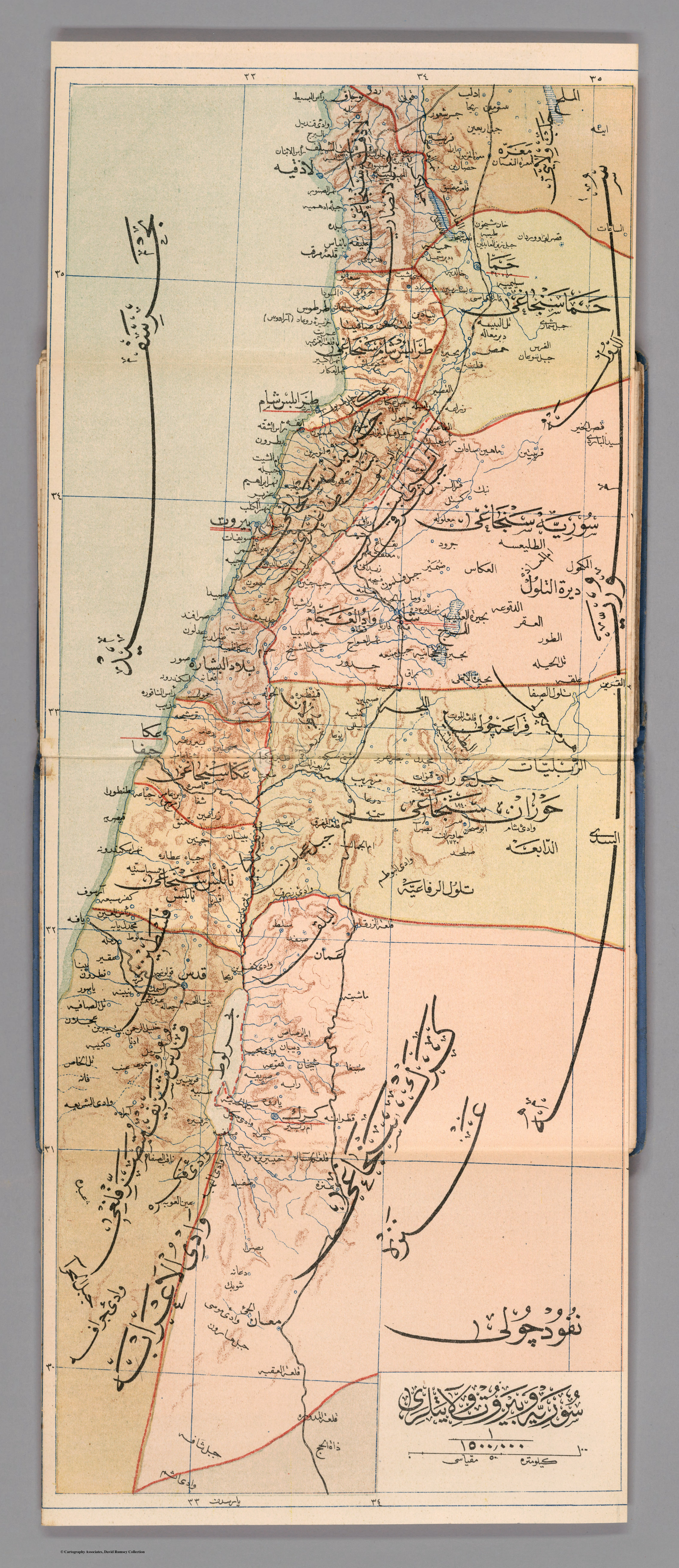
1907 map

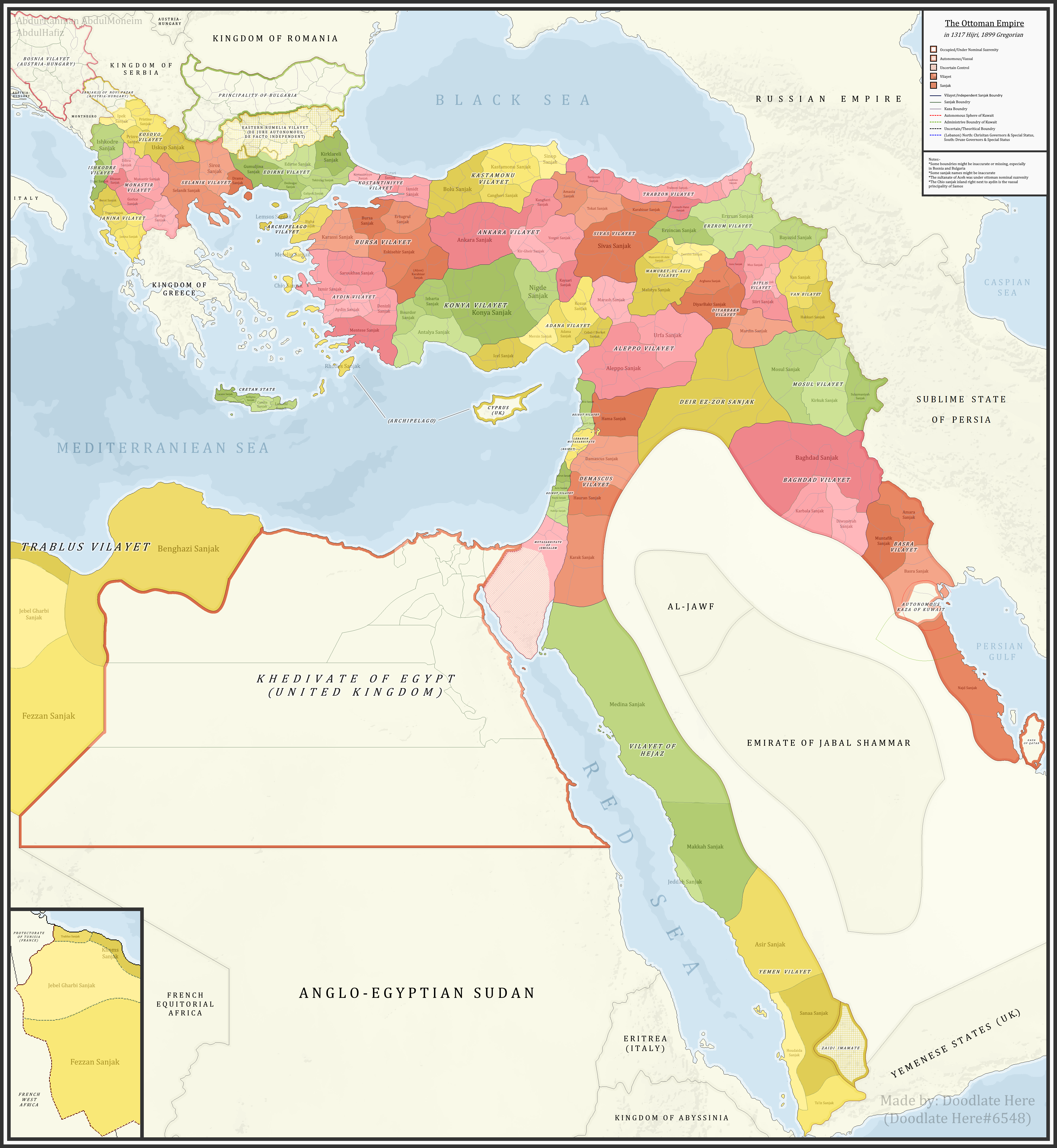
A map showing the administrative divisions of the Ottoman Empire in 1899, including the Mount Lebanon Mutasarrifate

== See also ==
- History of Lebanon under Ottoman rule
- Mount Lebanon Emirate
- Beirut Vilayet
- Mutasarrifate of Jerusalem
