= Seraglio of Baabda =

Historic government building in Lebanon

- سراي بعبدا (Arabic)
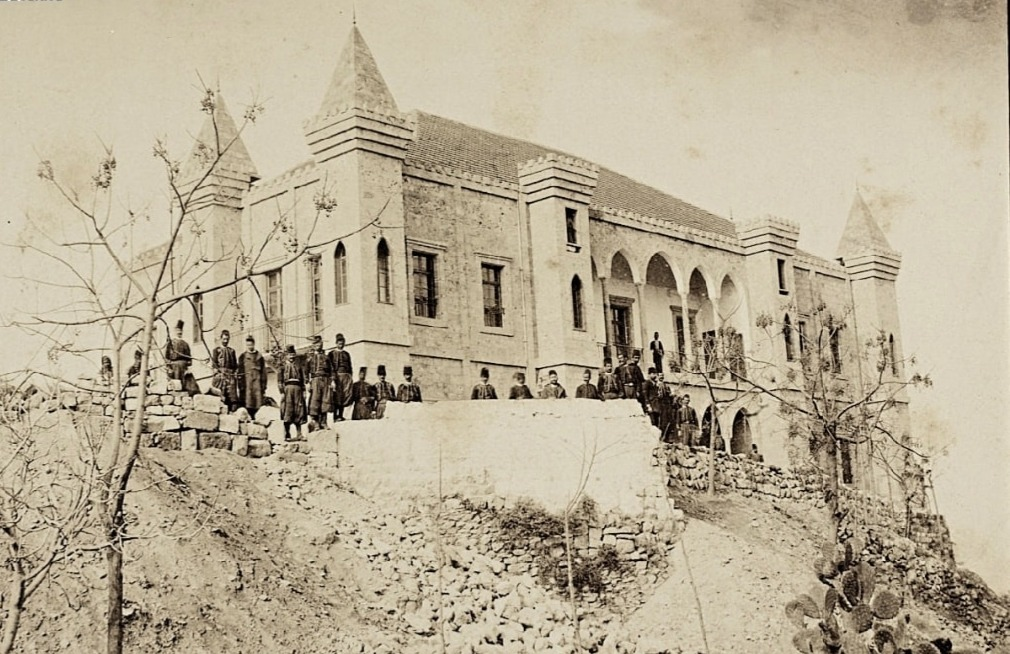

- Location within Lebanon
- 33°50′06″N 35°32′31″E
- Location: Baabda, Lebanon

History
- Built: 1775
- Built for: Haidar Shihab

Site notes
- Area: 7,852 square metres (84,520 sq ft)
- Architectural styles: Lebanese architecture, Ottoman architecture

The Seraglio of Baabda (Arabic: سراي بعبدا; also Baabda serail), is a historic building located in Baabda, Lebanon. The building served as a seat of government during the Mount Lebanon Mutasarrifate and later housed offices of the Mount Lebanon Governorate. Built of sandstone, the palace features four corner towers, and a surface area of 7,852 m^{2} (84,520 sq ft) spread over two floors surrounding an inner courtyard. Today, the seraglio houses the headquarters of the Mount Lebanon Governorate, as well as several administrative offices. The seraglio was added to Lebanon's list of protected monuments in 2008.

== Location ==
The Seraglio is located in the city of Baabda, at the southeast outskirts of Beirut, Lebanon. The palace stands on the highest hill of Baabda, which serves as the administrative capital of the Baabda District within the Mount Lebanon Governorate. It also hosts several embassies and governmental institutions, including the Baabda Presidential Palace, and the Lebanese Ministry of National Defense.

== History ==
The palace was built in several stages, beginning in 1775 by Emir Haidar Shihab. After his death in 1851, his son, Prince Melhem Shihab, continued the construction of the palace, which remained the property of the Shihab princes until 1883. During the mutasarrifate period, the first mutasarrif, Daoud Pacha (1861–1868), used the palace of Prince Asaad Shihab, located near Baabda, as his administrative seat. In 1868, Franco Pacha rented Prince Haidar's palace in Baabda and made it the center of his administration.

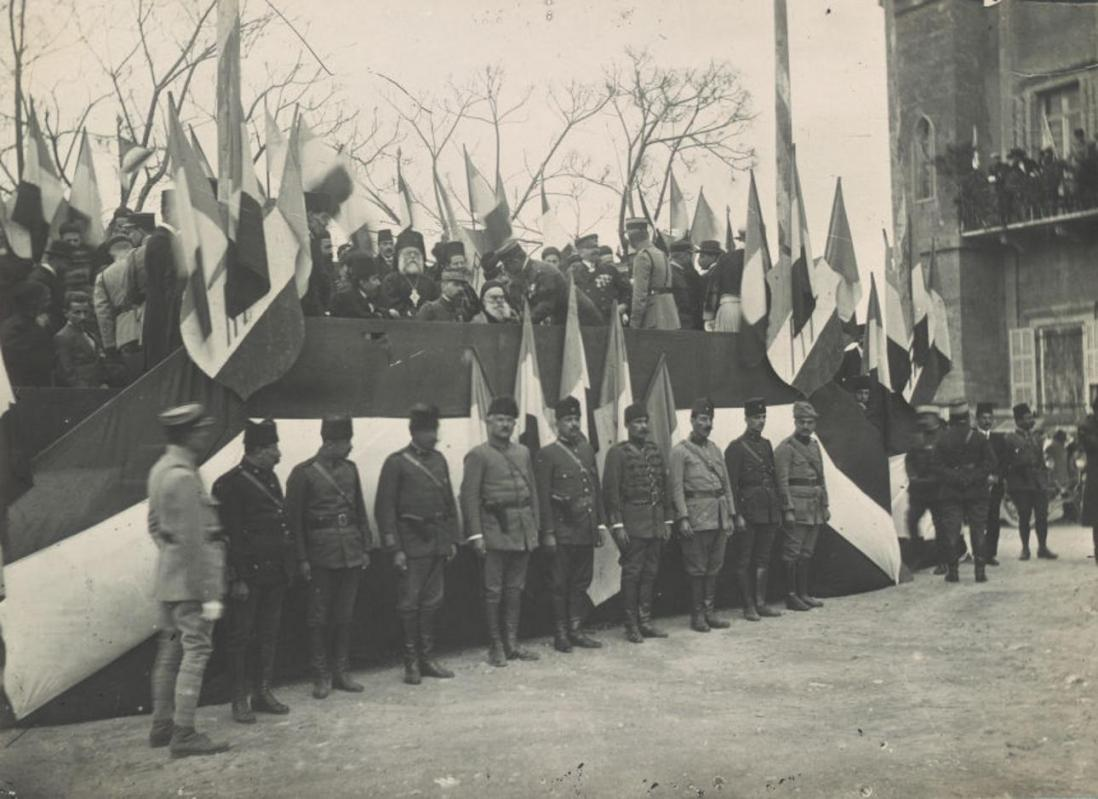
View from the official stand at the seraglio of Baabda during General Gouraud's visit in 1920, accompanied by the Maronite Church's patriarch Elias Peter Hoayek

The mandate of Rustem Pacha (1873–1883), saw the governmental offices relocate from Baada. Rustem was not popular with the local population and he personally blamed the Maronite Archbishop Pierre Bostani for violently turning the Maronite population against his authority. On 1 June 1878, he arrested the Archbishop and exiled him to Jerusalem. The inhabitants of Lebanon, particularly those of Baabda, rose up and signed a petition in protest. Rustem Pacha defiantly moved the seat of the mutasarrifate to the Shihab palace in Haret El-Botm, Hadath, causing negative repercussions on the economy of Baabda, which grew prosperous under the rule of the Shihab princes. The residents of Baabda formed a commission to purchase the Baabda seraglio and, around 250 families from Baabda decided to purchase the palace of Emir Haidar Shihab from the heirs for the sum of 1,000 gold Ottoman liras. One of the documents currently preserved by Lebanese historian Fares Mallat contains 250 signatures; it reads:

We, the undersigned, have entrusted Anton Effendi from our village of Baabda with the purchase of the seraglio known as the property of the heirs of the late Emir Melhem Shihab located in the village, at the price he deems appropriate—whether paid immediately or deferred—and that we will reimburse him. We, the signatories, wish to finalize the purchase and offer the seraglio as a gift without compensation to the government of the Mount Lebanon mutasarrifate, entrusting it with full management and authority over this act.

The residents' commission decided to implement a progressive income tax to repay the borrowed sum. A circular issued by the municipality of Baabda stated that "Every man between 20 and 60 years of age, registered in the Baabda records, was to pay a number of piastres based on his income...". Beirut-based businessman Selim Elias Helou agreed to lend the required amount. The transaction was finalized in 1887, and Youssef Beik Saab finalized the agreement and contacted the new mutasarrif Vaso Pacha (1883–1892) to convince him to establish the Shihab palace as the official seat of the mutasarrifate, a proposal that he accepted after consulting the Administrative Council of Mount Lebanon. The bulk of the Seraglio was built by Vaso Pasha who tore down the old Shihab palace. In 1897 the fifth mutasarrif Naoum Pasha (1892–1902) built the North pavilion, and his successor Muzaffer Pasha (1902–1907) added the monumental gate and the marble Ottoman Tughra.

The Baabda Seraglio hosted Lebanon's first Administrative Councils of Greater Lebanon following the declaration of its creation in 1920, before becoming the administrative center of the Mount Lebanon Governorate. In 1982, during the Israeli invasion of Lebanon, known as "Operation Peace for Galilee", the site was briefly occupied by Israeli armored units. On 30 March 2008, the seraglio was added to the list of protected monuments following advocacy by the Lebanese Association for Local Development (ALDL).

== Description ==
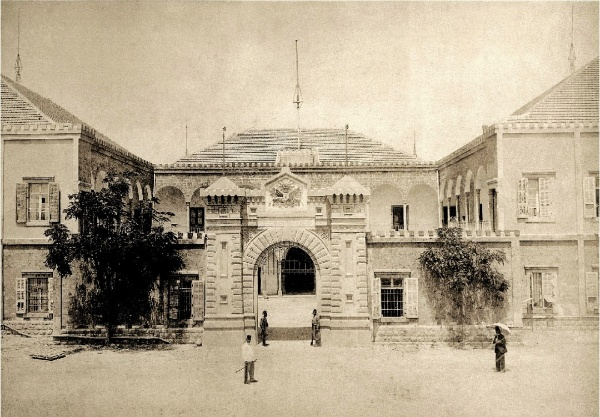
Main gate of the Baabda Seraglio.

The seraglio was built of sandstone, with towers at each corner. The building covers an area of 7,852 square metres (84,520 sq ft) spread over two floors, surrounding an inner courtyard.

== See also ==
- Shihab Palace in Hadath
- List of castles in Lebanon
