= Coussa (surname) =

Coussa is a surname. Notable people with the surname include:

- Gabriel Acacius Coussa (1897–1962), Syrian Melkite Catholic archbishop
- Nasrallah Coussa (died 1873), mutasarrif of the Mount Lebanon Mutasarrifate
- Naum Coussa, 5th mutasarrıf of the Mount Lebanon Mutasarrifate
- Paul Coussa (1917–2012), Iraqi prelate of the Armenian Catholic Church
- Yusuf Franko Coussa (1855–1933), Ottoman statesman and caricaturist, 7th mutasarrif of Mount Lebanon
