= Delphica =

Poem by Gérard de Nerval

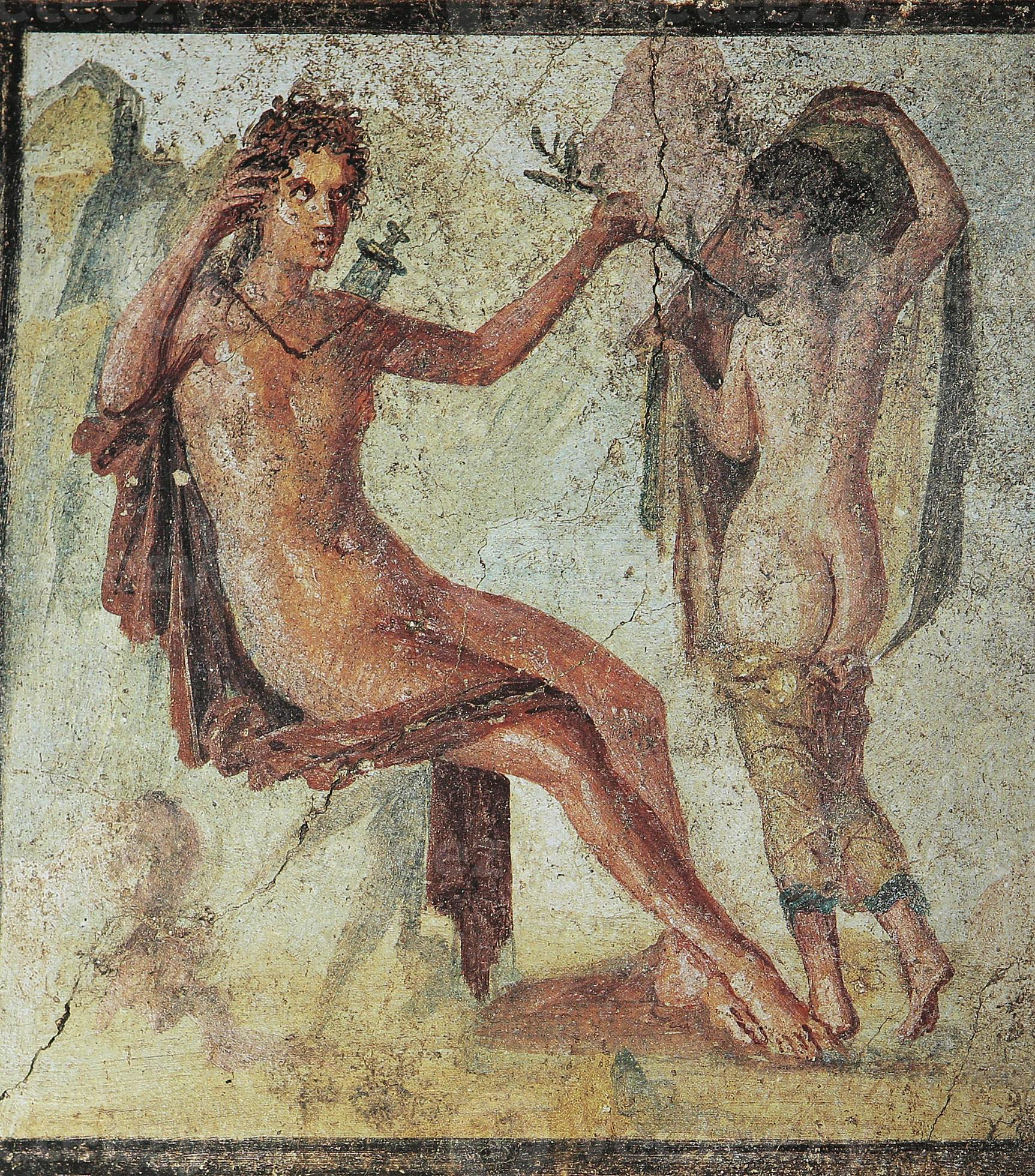
Apollo and Daphne, 1st-century AD fresco from Pompeii.

"Delphica" (French: Delfica) is a poem by the French writer Gérard de Nerval, first published in 1845 and later included in The Chimeras, a sequence of eight poems. Like the other Chimeras, it is a sonnet and was written during a period of mental health problems. The poem is addressed to the naiad Daphne, evokes the ancient cult of Apollo at Delphi and forecasts that the gods of classical mythology will return. It revolves around the view that paganism has been dormant or clandestine during the Christian epoch and will see a resurgence. It was published in the magazine L'Artiste and Nerval's book Petits châteaux de Bohème (1853) before the complete Chimeras were published in The Daughters of Fire (1854).

== Background ==
Gérard de Nerval (1808–1855) wrote the eight poems that became known as The Chimeras during a period when he had mental health problems. His doctor Émile Blanche recommended him to use his writing as a form of therapy. "Delphica" took inspiration from Nerval's travels in Italy and from Johann Wolfgang von Goethe's poem "Mignon" in Wilhelm Meister's Apprenticeship (1795–96). It is an amalgamation of two previous sonnets by Nerval: the first eight lines were adapted from "À J.-Y. Colonna" and the last three from "À Made Aguado". Both predecessors are known from the manuscript Dumesnil de Gramont α, dated to 1840–1845.

== Structure and summary ==
Delfica

La connais-tu, Dafné, cette ancienne romance,
Au pied du sycomore, ou sous les lauriers blancs,
Sous l'olivier, le myrthe ou les saules tremblants,
Cette chanson d'amour… qui toujours recommence !

Reconnais-tu le Temple, au péristyle immense,
Et les citrons amers où s'imprimaient tes dents ?
Et la grotte, fatale aux hôtes imprudents,
Où du dragon vaincu dort l'antique semence.

Ils reviendront, ces dieux que tu pleures toujours !
Le temps va ramener l'ordre des anciens jours;
La terre a tressailli d'un souffle prophétique…

Cependant la sibylle au visage latin
Est endormie encor sous l'arc de Constantin :
— Et rien n'a dérangé le sévère portique.

"Delphica", like the other Chimeras, is a sonnet composed in French alexandrine, which means it has fourteen lines with twelve syllables each. Nerval frequently broke the rules of the "regular" French sonnet as defined by Théodore de Banville, which was supposed to have the rhyme scheme ABBA ABBA CCD EDE. Unlike in some of the Chimeras, the quatrains in "Delphica" do have the enclosed rhyme structure that Banville preferred. The rhyming sounds of the quatrains are assonances: /ɑ̃s/ and /ɑ̃/. The two tercets that close the poem break the assonance with the rhymes /ur/, /ɛ̃/ and /ik/.

The subject's starting point is Ovid's Metamorphoses 1.488–611, which tells the story of how the god Apollo became infatuated with the naiad Daphne and how she was transformed into a laurel tree. The poet addresses Daphne and asks if she remembers a love song that continuously begins to play among trees and bushes. He asks if she recognises the Temple of Apollo at Delphi and alludes to two myths: Apollo slaying the dragon Python, and the hero Cadmus planting the dragon's teeth to grow warriors who founded a new civilisation, told in Metamorphoses 3.1–187. In the first tercet, the poet promises that the gods of classical mythology will return and the ancient order be restored. The final three lines say that "the sibyl" continues to sleep under the Arch of Constantine.

== Themes and interpretations ==
"Delphica" concerns the culture of classical antiquity and how it has survived into modern times. Bertrand Marchal connects the poem's dragon to other motifs in the Chimera poems: the dragon in "Anteros", the volcano in "Myrtho" and the Chimera of the collective title. They all signify, according to Marchal, the concept of an eternal paganism that has lived on in clandestine forms since the victory of Christianity. Frederick Burwick writes that the image of the dragon's teeth as generative seeds is echoed in a description of Daphne biting a lemon and leaving marks with her teeth. Along with being sexually and erotically charged, the images have an element of unfulfilled desire and function as symbols for a rebirth that is yet to happen. The Arch of Constantine, under which the pagan sibyl slumbers, functions as a symbol for the Christian epoch. The end of the poem suggests that the resurgence of pagan myth may take a long time because there is nothing that disturbs the sibyl's sleep.

When "Delphica" first was published, it had the epigraph "Ultima Cumaei venit iam carmanis aetas", which is Latin for "Now comes the last age foretold by the Cumaean sibyl". Upon republication in 1853, this was replaced by "Iam redit et virgo", meaning "And now the virgin returns". Both epigraphs are from the opening of Vergil's Eclogue 4, written around 42 BC, which Emperor Constantine and others had interpreted as prophetic about the advent of Christianity. Nerval's intention may have been to counter this interpretation with an oracular poem about the return of the pagan gods. In its final form, "Delphica" has no epigraph.

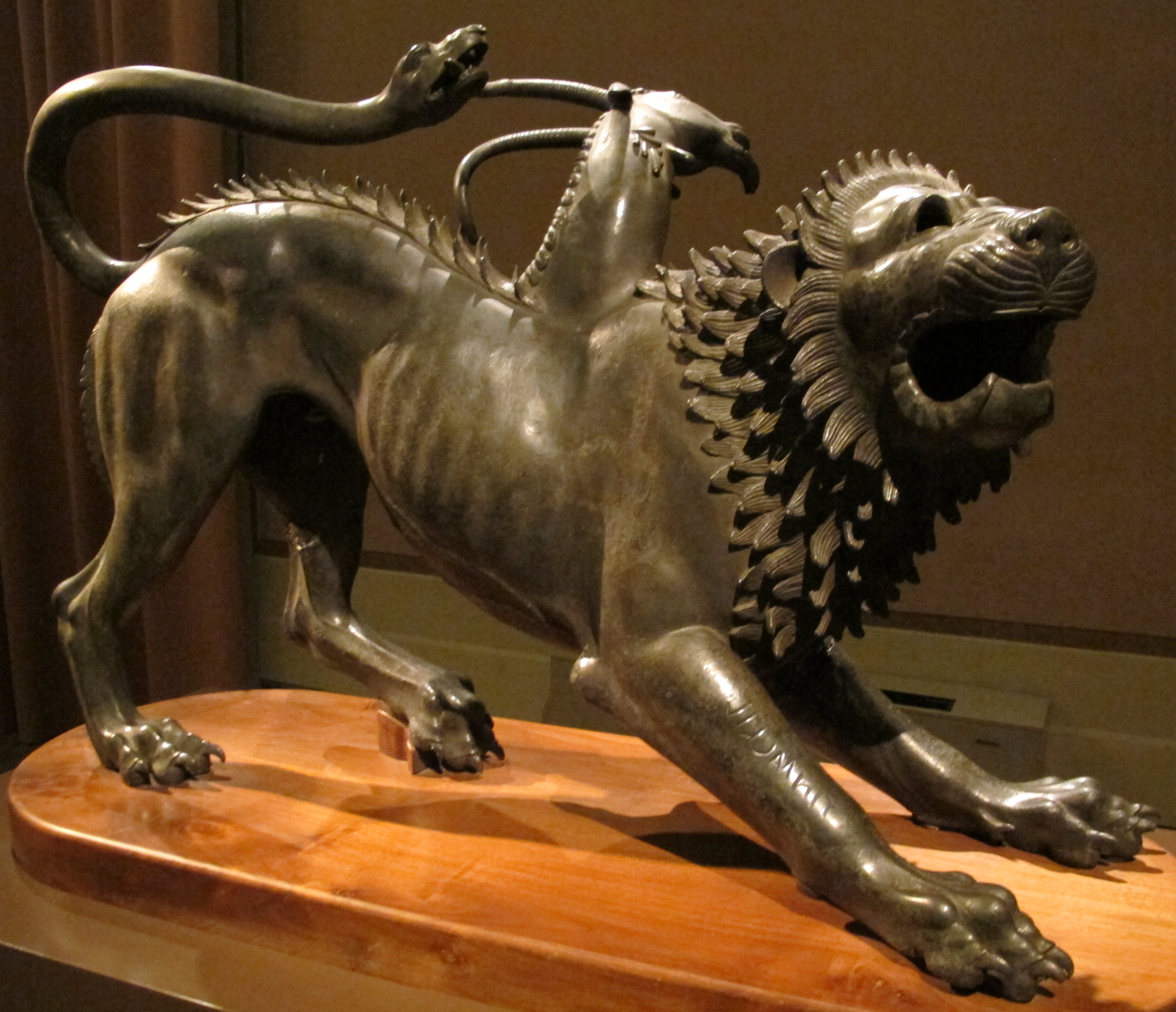
The Chimera of Arezzo, c. 400 BC. The Chimera is a mythological hybrid creature.

The reference to Daphne and thereby laurel trees in "Delphica" can be connected to a passage in "Myrtho" which says that hydrangea and myrtle are unified "under the branches of Vergil's laurel" (French: sous les rameaux du laurier de Virgile). Like the quatrains of "Delphica", this line in "Myrtho" was adapted from "À J.-Y. Colonna" and is thus part of the original continuation of "Delphica"'s first eight lines. The literary scholar Sarah Gubbins connects the image, which is not explained in any of the poems, to the explicit contrast between Christianity and paganism in "Delphica"'s tercets, writing that Nerval may point toward a fusion of elements that appear to be incompatible, like the mythical Chimera.

For a 1973 translation, Curtis Bennett interpreted Nerval's turn to paganism as a protest against repressive doctrines of the Catholic Church. This is criticised by Burwick who says the thesis has distorted Bennett's translation.

== Publication ==
Like several of the Chimeras, "Delphica" first appeared in the magazine L'Artiste where it was published on 28 December 1845. It was there titled "Vers dorés" (lit. 'Golden verses'), which later became the title of another Chimera poem. It was republished in the Revue de Paris in November 1851 and with the title "Daphné" in Nerval's book Petits châteaux de Bohème (1853; lit. 'Little Castles of Bohemia'), where it appears in the section Mysticisme. The Chimeras were first published together at the end of Nerval's 1854 book The Daughters of Fire, where "Delphica"'s final title was established. The title is a Latinised and feminine form of Delphi.

== Legacy ==
W. B. Yeats was influenced by "Delphica" when he conceived a return in his poem "The Second Coming" (1920).

== See also ==
- Daphne (plant)
- Delphic Sibyl
- Modern Paganism
