= Gabriel André Aucler =

French lawyer and pagan revivalist

Gabriel André Aucler (Note: The Biographie universelle : ancienne et moderne (1843) gives Auclerc as his last name.) (mid 18th-century – 1815) was a French lawyer who after the French Revolution adopted the name Quintus Nautius and tried to reestablish pagan religiosity with himself as its leader. He created religious clothing for himself and conducted pagan rites at his house. He published a book in 1799, La Thréicie, which presents his religious views. His teachings became the subject of an essay by Gérard de Nerval, included in Les Illuminés in 1852.

== Early life and professional career ==
Gabriel André Aucler was born in Argenton-en-Berry in the middle of the 18th century. He became a lawyer by profession.

== Pagan revivalism ==
Aucler admired ancient Greece and ancient Rome and became a strong supporter of the French Revolution, which he viewed as a way to recreate an ancient republic. During the French First Republic, he became known for his attempt to reinstate paganism. He began to call himself Quintus Nautius, claimed to descend from an ancient Roman priest family and fashioned himself as the leader of a revived paganism, creating priestly clothes for himself. He performed rites conceived as restorations of the ancient mysteries of Orpheus at his house. His followers primarily consisted of his household.

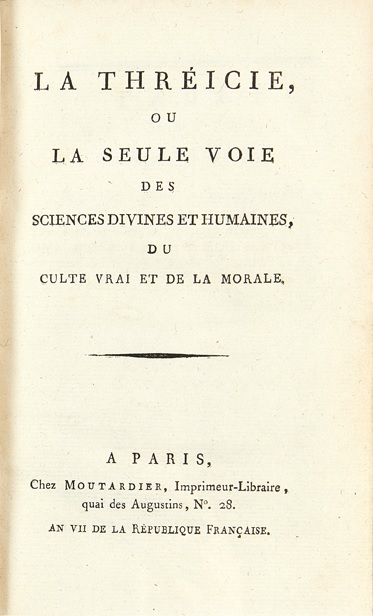
Title page of La Thréicie

Aucler wrote a book about his religious views with the title La Thréicie, ou la seule voie des sciences divines et humaines, du culte vrai et de la morale (lit. 'The Thracian; or, The Only Way of the Divine and Human Sciences, of the True Worship and Morality'). It is 440 pages long and was published under the name Q Nautius Aucler by Moutardier in Paris in 1799, or VII according to the French Republican calendar. The Thracian of the title is Orpheus, referencing an epithet from Vergil. The book promotes a revival of paganism in contemporary France and a Pythagorean theme of universal animation. It condemns the conversion to Christianity as violent, presents Christianity as morally bankrupt and dismisses the esotericism of Maximilien Robespierre. The book was written when the revolutionary fervour had decreased; according to the Biographie universelle : ancienne et moderne, it obscures the full extent of Aucler's teachings. Aucler continued to promote paganism after Catholicism had been restored in France.

== Late life ==
A poem Aucler wrote toward the end of his life has been interpreted as a recantation of his views. It was published in Bourges in 1813 in a 32-page booklet with the title L'Ascendant de la religion, ou Récit des crimes et des fureurs, de la conversion et de la mort chrétienne d'un grand coupable, qui ont eu lieu récemment dans la ville de Bourges (lit. 'The Ascendant of Religion, or Account of the crimes and furies, of the conversion and Christian death of a great culprit, which took place recently in the city of Bourges'). Aucler died in Bourges in 1815.

== Legacy ==
The occultist Lazare Lenain in Amiens was influenced by Aucler and continued to perform pagan rites after the Bourbon Restoration. He produced a book in 1823, The Science of the Kabbalah, which combines Kabbalah and occultism with themes from La Thréicie.

Gérard de Nerval wrote an essay about Aucler, published in November 1851 in the Revue de Paris as "Les Païens de la République: Quintus Aucler" (lit. 'The Pagans of the Republic: Quintus Aucler') and republished in 1852 as "Quintus Aucler" as the final entry in the book Les Illuminés. Unlike other portraits in Les Illuminés, "Quintus Aucler" provides almost no biographical information, but quotes extensively from La Thréicie. Together with the poem "Christ in the Olive Grove" (1844) and the book Voyage to the Orient (1851), "Quintus Aucler" has been analyzed as central in Nerval's interest in religious decline. Nerval presented Aucler's paganism as an example of the persistence of religiosity in spite of dwindling belief around him. He wrote that Aucler might be taken for a madman when viewed from outside of his social context, but described La Thréicie as "a book which imposes respect through honesty of intentions and sincerity of beliefs". (Note: Original quotation: "un livre qui impose le respect par l'honnêté des intentions et par la sincerité des croyances")

Jean-Joseph Gaume devoted a section to Aucler in his work La Révolution (1856). Gaume compared Aucler's paganism to contemporaneous projects such as the "allegorical mysticism" of François Antoine de Boissy d'Anglas, Pierre Gaspard Chaumette and Robespierre, the "timid polytheism" of Jean-Baptiste Chemin-Dupontès and François Antoine Daubermesnil, the Cult of Reason and the plant-covered altars of Theophilanthropy. Gaume wrote that Aucler stood out with his dissatisfaction with everything except the full restoration of ancient polytheism and its establishment as state religion.
