= La Pandora =

Novella by Gérard de Nerval

La Pandora is a short novella by the French poet and writer Gérard de Nerval. The work draws on Nerval's stay in Vienna in 1839–1840 and describes an infatuation with a theatre actress. The book was unfinished and largely unpublished at the time of the writer's death in 1855. It has since been published in various editions that attempt to reconstruct the author's intentions.

== Publishing history ==
Begun in 1853, Nerval intended Pandora for inclusion in Les Filles du Feu, but it was not finished in time for the volume. The first part was published by Alexandre Dumas in the journal Le Mousquetaire in October 1854. Further publication was interrupted by Nerval's suicide. Several attempts have been made to produce a complete version, including editions by Aristide Marie in 1921, Jean Guillaume in 1968, and Jean Senelier in 1975.

Pandora is closely related to Les Amours de Vienne, published in Revue de Paris in 1841 and included in Nerval's book Voyage en Orient in 1852, although editors and critics have disagreed over the precise nature of the relationship. One of the manuscripts of Pandora includes the subtitle Suite des Amours de Vienne, with the word "Suite" crossed out. Both Guillaume and Senelier's editions of Pandora incorporate some passages from Les Amours de Vienne to produce a more logical narrative.
