= Shihab Palace in Hadath =

- قصر شهاب في الحدث (Arabic)
- Location within Lebanon
- 33°50′19″N 35°31′59″E
- Location: Haret el Botm-Hadath, Lebanon

History
- Built: Late 16th century
- Built for: Melhim Shihab

Site notes
- Architectural style: Lebanese architecture

The Shihab Palace in Hadath is a historic residence originally built by the Maan emirs in the late 16th century and later passed to the Shihab family. In the mid-twentieth century, Emir Farid Hares Shihab restored the palace; then the palace was acquired by the Spanish government in 1964 and has since housed the Spanish Embassy in Lebanon.

== Location ==
The Shihab Palace is located in the Haret el Botm neighborhood in the Hadath municipality, around 8 km (5.0 mi) southeast of Beirut. Situated at an altitude of 150 m (490 ft) above sea level, in the Baabda District in Mount Lebanon Governorate.

== History and occupants ==
The Shihab Palace was built by the Maan emirs in the late 16th century and passed to the Shihab family in the 18th century. (Note: Lebanese historian Tony Mufarrej attributes the construction of the palace to Emir Melhem Shihab in 1697.) The first recorded restoration of the palace was undertaken by Emir Melhem Shihab in 1698 who resided in the palace from 1732 to 1754 during his rule as Emir of Mount Lebanon. The palace later became the residence of Emir Sayed Ahmad, who ruled from 1775 to 1786. The residence of Emirs of Mount Lebanon moved to Beiteddine during the reign of Emir Bashir II (r. 1789–1840). During this period, Emir Faris Shihab undertook another restoration in 1797, commemorated by a marble plaque above the palace entrance. The palace functioned as the administrative center during the short reign of Emir Bachir III (r. 1840–1842). The palace survived damage during the 1860 civil war, including the destruction of its library and manuscript collection.

In 1950, Emir Farid Hares Shihab, then director of General Security and Vice President of Interpol purchased his cousins' shares of the property and carried out extensive restoration work, enlisting the expertise of Pierre-Henri Coupel, an architect and archaeologist specializing in historical monuments. Following the 1958 Lebanon crisis, Farid relocated to France and entrusted the palace to his friend, Alfonso Merry del Val y Alzola, then-Spanish ambassador to Lebanon. The Spanish government acquired the palace in 1964, after which it became the residence of the Spanish ambassador to Lebanon. On 17 April 1989, amid fighting between the Lebanese Army and Syrian forces, Spanish ambassador Pedro Manuel de Arístegui was at the residence with his father-in-law, retired ambassador and writer Tawfiq Yusuf Awwad, and his sister-in-law, poet Samia Tutunji. Three 240 mm mortar shells struck the property, the last hitting the small salon where the three had taken shelter and killing them.

== Description ==
The Shihab Palace in Hadath consists of 40 rooms, It's accessed by a monumental entrance featuring two reliefs of a heraldic lion taming a severed head above each of the entrance corners. Above the main portico are pigeon towers, and the façade features ablaq (alternating white and ochre ashlar masonry), a technique influenced by Mamluk architecture. The mandaloun windows have segmented arches decorated with rosettes. Inscriptions on marble plaques document restoration works in 1698 under Emir Melhem Shihab, and in 1797 under Emir Faris Shihab.

== See also ==
- Palace of Emir Ahmad Shihab
