= Yusuf Franko Coussa =

Ottoman statesman and caricaturist (1855–1933)

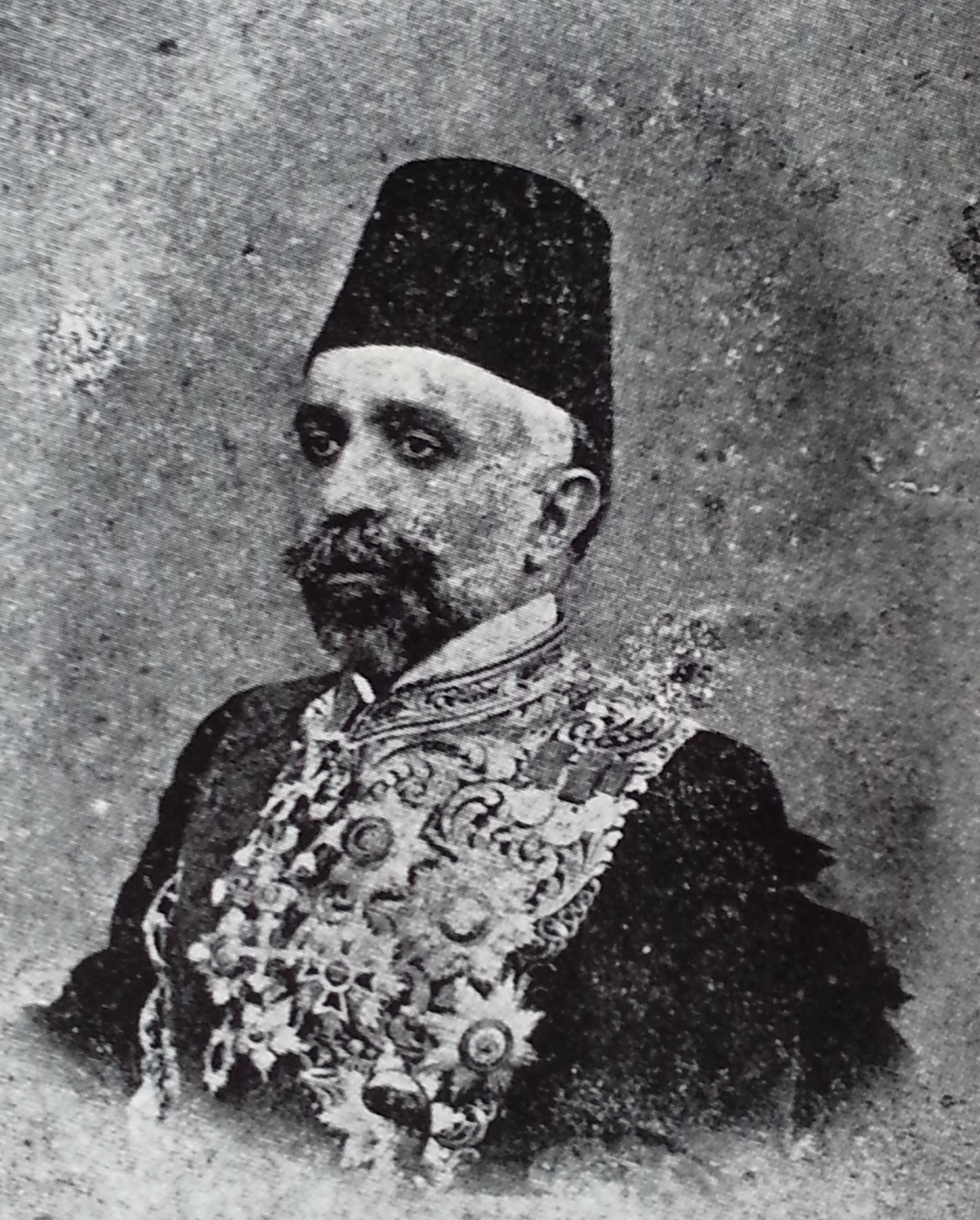

7th Mutasarrif of Mount Lebanon
- Preceded by: Władysław Czajkowski
- Succeeded by: Ohannes Kouyoumdjian

Yusuf Franko Coussa (known as Yusuf Franko Paşa) (1855–1933) was an Ottoman statesman and caricaturist. From 1907 to 1912, he served as the mutasarrıf of the Mount Lebanon Mutasarrifate. He was a Syrian Christian from Aleppo. He was the son of Nasri Franco Pasha.
