= Sylvie (novel) =

Novella by Gérard de Nerval

Sylvie (1853) is a novella by French Romanticist Gérard de Nerval. It was first published in the periodical La Revue des Deux Mondes in 1853 and as a book in Les Filles du feu in 1854, just a few months before Nerval killed himself in January 1855.

== Background ==
The novel contains autobiographical elements. As in the story, Nerval often traveled to Germany and the East. Nerval had an unhappy love for a real actress, Jenny Colon. He had a female childhood friend named Adrienne, whom he unhappily lost earlier. These unattainable and lost female figures are represented in the story, and in his other works. In real life, Nerval lost his mother at an early age.

Guillaume Apollinaire relates (in La Vie Anecdotique) that while writing Sylvie, Nerval spent a week in Chantilly solely to study a sunset that he needed for it.

== Plot ==
An idyll written as a reminiscence, the story is about a hero's love for three women, all of whom he loses – a hymn to unattainable, unrequited love. The story begins when a paragraph in a newspaper plunges the narrator into his memories as a younger man. The perspective seems to shift back and forth between the past and present, so the reader is never entirely sure if the narrator is recounting past events from memory or retelling current events as they happen.

The narrator, of noble status and who has recently come into an inheritance, decides to leave Paris, where he is living a debauched life of theater and drink, and return to the love of his youth, a peasant girl named Sylvie who has classic features and brunette hair, a "timeless ideal." She sews gloves for a living and ends up marrying another man who is more equal to her class. The narrator also loves a seductive actress in Paris named Aurélia, who has many suitors who tell her empty idylls of love. Still, none love her for who she is – including the narrator, who sees her as a lovely illusion that fades in the daylight of reality. The narrator also loves Adrienne, who is of noble birth and tall with blonde hair; she is an "ideal beauty," but she lives in a convent and dies an early death. Ultimately, he loves all three but obtains none, seemingly for reasons beyond and within his making.

Sylvie has many features of Romanticism, including flowing descriptions of a beautiful but lost natural world, appreciation for the architecture and traditions of the Middle Ages, and Greek traditions; critics have praised the writing for its lucid and lyrical style. The use of color appears unique, with binary oppositions serving as a simplifying mechanism to make distant memories emerge more strikingly from the mist.

== Reception ==
Sylvie is often considered Nerval's prose masterpiece and has been a favorite of Marcel Proust, André Breton, Joseph Cornell, and Umberto Eco. Julien Gracq wrote of Sylvie in 1966: "I know of no more enchanted narrative in our language" ("Je ne connais aucun récit plus enchanté dans notre langue"). Harold Bloom included it in The Western Canon (1994).

== Notes ==
- Whitall, James (translator and introduction). Daughters of Fire: Sylvie-Emilie-Octavie, by Gérard de Nerval, published by N. L. Brown, 1922
