= The Chimeras =

Series of sonnets by Gérard de Nerval

The Chimeras (French: Les Chimères) is a sequence of sonnets by the French writer Gérard de Nerval, made up of eight individual poems and a total of twelve sonnets. The poems are: "El Desdichado", "Myrtho", "Horus", "Anteros", "Delphica", "Artemis", "Christ at Gethsemane" (I–V) and "Golden Verses". They were published in the book Les Filles du feu in January 1854.

== Background ==
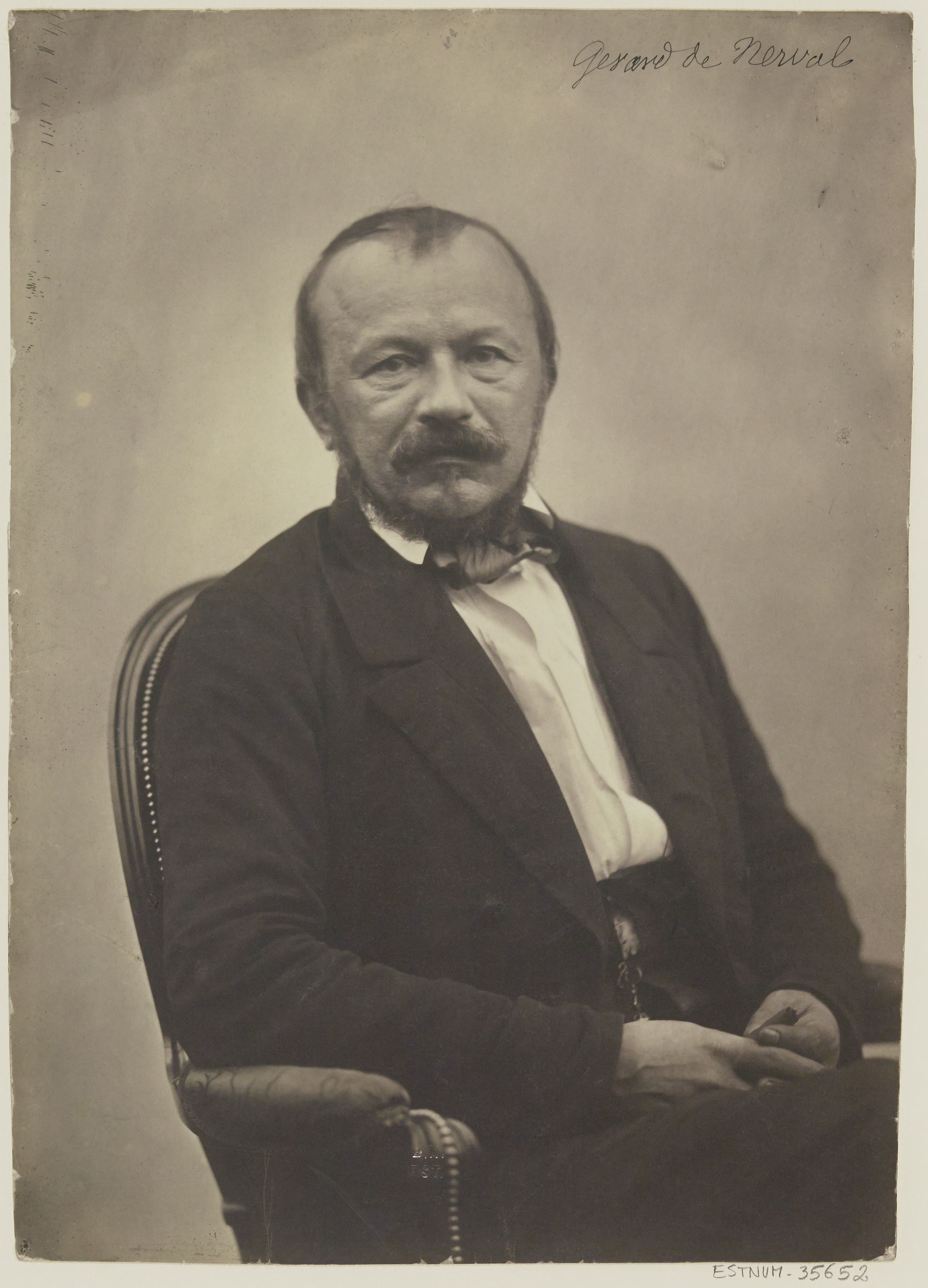
Photograph of Nerval by Nadar

The writer Gérard de Nerval (1808–1855) had mental health problems and his doctor Émile Blanche had recommended him to continue writing as a form of therapy. The poems of The Chimeras may express his struggle with a particularly difficult period; Nerval spent time in psychiatric hospitals in 1840–1841, 1851, 1853 and 1854. In 1853 he temporarily lost the ability to speak and write, and his identity. His illness made him identify with figures from myths and legends, and in the interplay with these characters in his poems he attempted to create a self. Regarding the obscurity of his Chimera poems, Nerval wrote that they "would lose their charm by being explained, if that thing was possible".

== Poems ==
- "El Desdichado" The first-person narrator introduces himself as the Prince of Aquitaine and claims to have crossed the Acheron–one of the rivers of the Greek underworld–twice.
- "Myrtho" The poem praises Myrtho, the personification of the myrtle, a plant that was sacred to Venus. In the plays of Plautus it is associated with female sexual desire.
- "Horus" The story of Kneph, Isis and Osiris from Egyptian mythology is used to convey a message about spiritual growth. The poem suggests a parallel to Vulcan, Venus and Mars from Roman mythology.
- "Anteros" (French: Antéros). Anteros, the brother of Eros and god of unrequited love, addresses the philosopher Iamblichus about the nature of torment and rage. He claims ancestry from Antaeus, identifies Satan with Baal or Dagon and denounces Jehovah.
- "Delphica" (French: Delfica). Inspired by Nerval's Italian journey and Johann Wolfgang von Goethe's poem "Kennst du das Land", the poem expresses its author's belief that paganism will resurge in an enlightened form which will subsume the Christian ethos.
- "Artemis" (French: Artémis). Evokes the goddess Artemis through a deck of Tarot cards, identifying her with the queen.
- "Christ in the Olive Grove" (French: Le Christ aux Oliviers) (I–V). Five sonnets about Jesus on the Mount of Olives in Jerusalem, adapted from the New Testament's Matt. 24–26, Mark 13–14, Luke 19, 21 and John 8, 13. The portrayal, which focuses on the return of spirit to the world after the death of God, is inspired by Jean Paul's reading of the gospels in the novel Siebenkäs (1796–97) and Germaine de Staël's reading of Jean Paul in On Germany (1813).
- "Golden Verses" (French: Vers dorés). The poem is inspired by Pythagoreanism and the idea of a universal soul, as interpreted by Jean-Baptiste-Claude Delisle de Sales in the book De la philosophie de la nature (1777).

Some French editions have an Autres Chimères section containing nine additional sonnets, namely "La Tête de l'Armée", "A Madame Ida Dumas", "A Madame Aguado", "A Hélène de Mecklenburg", "A Madame Sand", an alternate version of "Myrto", "A Louise d'Or. Reine", "A J Colonna" and "Érythréa".

== Publication and translations ==
The eight poems were published in their final form in January 1854, when they were included at the end of Nerval's short story collection Les Filles du feu. Several of them had appeared before in the magazine L'Artiste. "Le Christ aux Oliviers" was published there on 31 March 1844, "Vers dorés" (as "Pensée antique", "ancient thought") on 16 March 1845 and "Delfica" (as "Vers dorée") on 28 December 1845. "El Desdichado" was published in Le Mousquetaire on 10 December 1853.

In 1957, Geoffrey Wagner published Selected Writings of Gerard de Nerval (Grove Press, New York), the last section of which was a selection of Nerval's poetry which included the Chimera poems, though not "Le Christ aux Oliviers". In 1958, Brian Hill translated the complete series along with a number of other Nerval poems under the title Fortune's Fool, 35 poems (R. Hart-Davis, London). Also in 1958, Anchor Books published An Anthology of French Poetry from Nerval to Valéry in English Translation, which contains Chimera poems translated by Richmond Lattimore ("El Desdichado" and "Delphica"), Joseph Bennett ("Myrtho"), Barbara Howes ("Horus", "Anteros" and "Artemis") and Daisy Aldan ("Golden Verses"). Andrew Hoyem interpreted the eight poems as Chimeras: Transfigurations of "les Chimères" by Gérard de Nerval, published in 1966. Another English translation by an American, the poet Robin Blaser, had been published in 1965 in the magazine Open Space; Blaser's colleague Robert Duncan reacted negatively to this version, calling it "irresponsible" and a "perversion", and published his own translation in 1967 in the journal Audit. The Northern Irish poet Derek Mahon has made a free interpretation and adaptation of the poems, published in 1982 as The Chimeras. Later translations include one by Peter Jay published in 1984 with essays by Richard Holmes and Jay, one by William Stone published in a bilingual edition in 1999, and one by Henry Weinfield published in 2005 with monotypes by the artist Douglas Kinsey. In 2023, Richard Robinson published the original 8 plus 'The Armed Head' in Sylvie & The Chimeras, Portland, OR: Sunny Lou Publishing, 2023. ISBN 978-1-95539-240-2

== Legacy ==
The twelve sonnets of The Chimeras are Nerval's most famous poems. With their focus on the beauty of words, and lasting resistance to critical interpretation, they can be seen as precursors to Symbolism and the poetry of Stéphane Mallarmé.

A phrase from El Desdichado (le prince d'Aquitaine à la tour abolie") is quoted by T.S. Eliot near the end of The Waste Land.

== See also ==
- Chimera (mythology)
- Grotesque (architecture)
