= Naum Coussa =

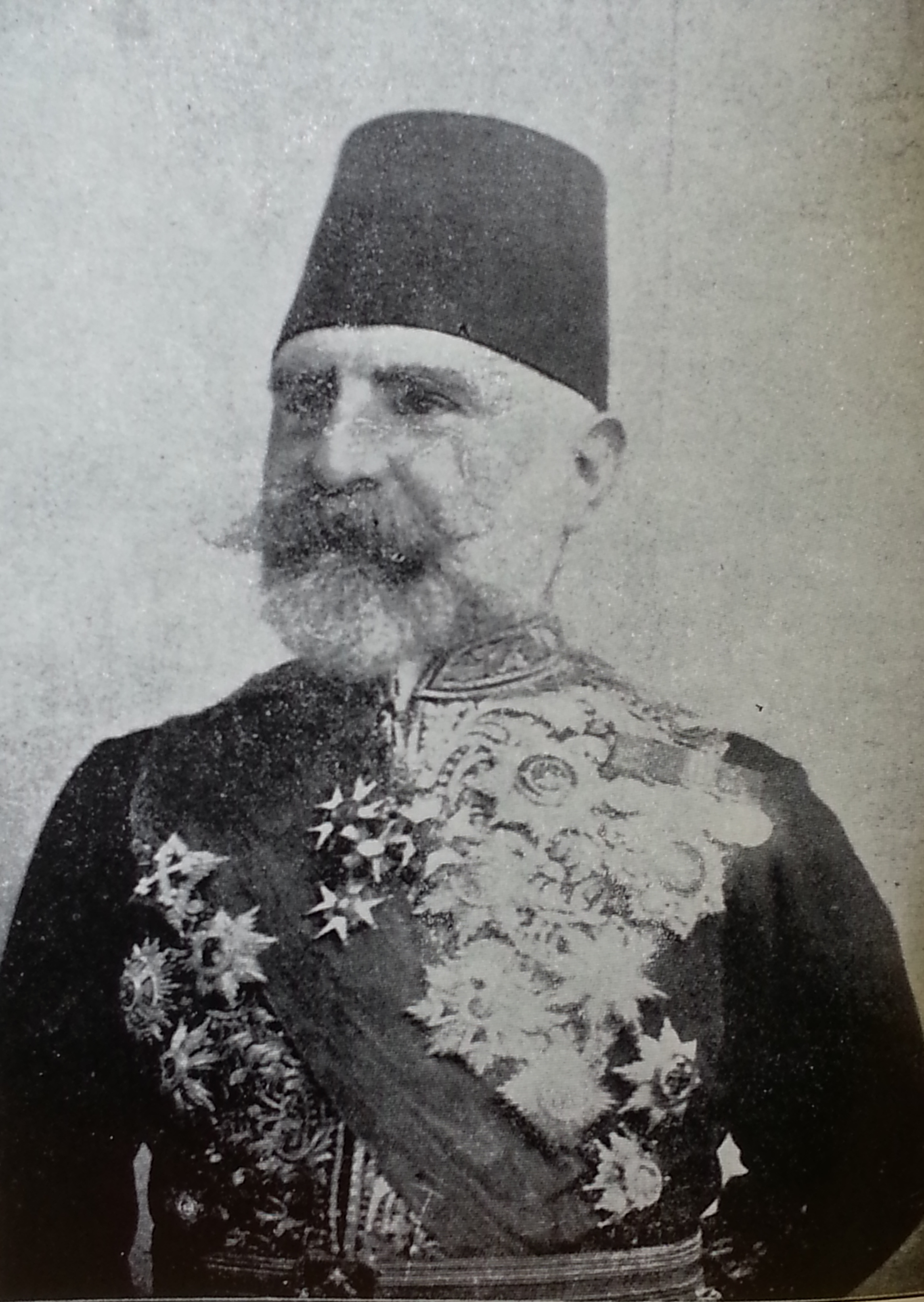

5th Mutassarif of Mount Lebanon
- Preceded by: Pashko Vasa
- Succeeded by: Władysław Czajkowski

Naum Coussa (Known As Naum Pasha), was the 5th mutasarrıf of the Mount Lebanon Mutasarrifate from 1892 to 1902. He was a Melkite Greek Catholic from Aleppo, Syria. He was the nephew of Nasri Franko Pasha.

He started his term by carrying out reforms in the management and removing employees accused of bribery. He also organized the financial situation of the administration. Naum Pasha initiated several construction projects in Baakleen, Jezzine, Cuniye, Batroun, Amioun, and Bhannes, repaired bridges, and constructed over 480 kilometers of roads. His administration was described as secure, peaceful, and stable, and during this period, a large-scale emigration from Mount Lebanon to abroad began. He was known for treating both Christians and Muslims equally, and after the end of his term in 1902, he returned to Constantinople (Istanbul).

After returning to Constantinople, he was in February 1903 appointed Under Secretary of State for Foreign Affairs.
