= Jean Bernard Duseigneur =

French romantic sculptor

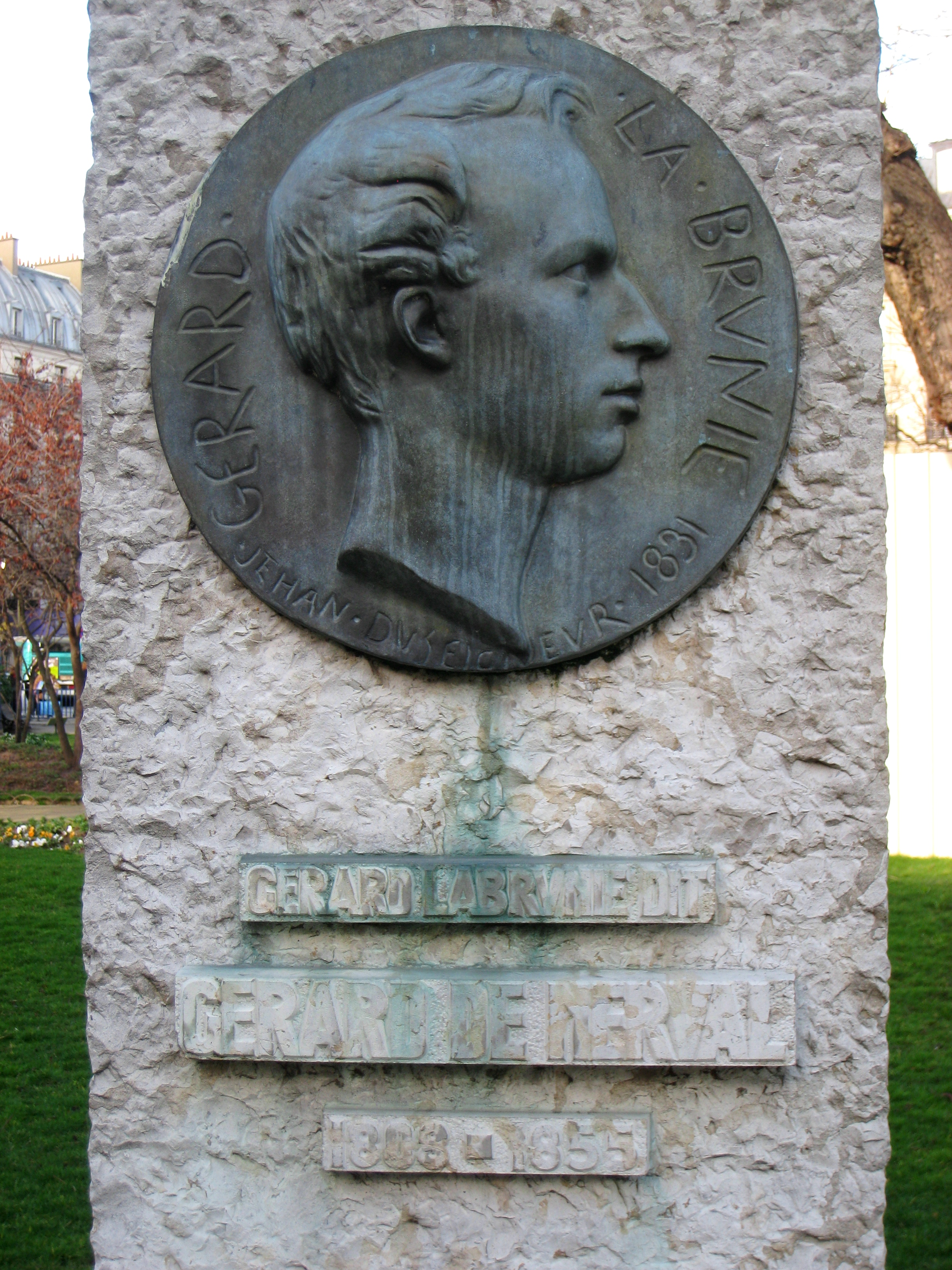
Jean Bernard Duseigneur's bust of poet Gérard de Nerval.

Jean Bernard Duseigneur (1808 – 6 March 1866), also known as Jehan Duseigneur, was a French romantic sculptor.
