= Baabda =

Capital city of Mount Lebanon Governorate, Lebanon

Baabda بعبدا
- City
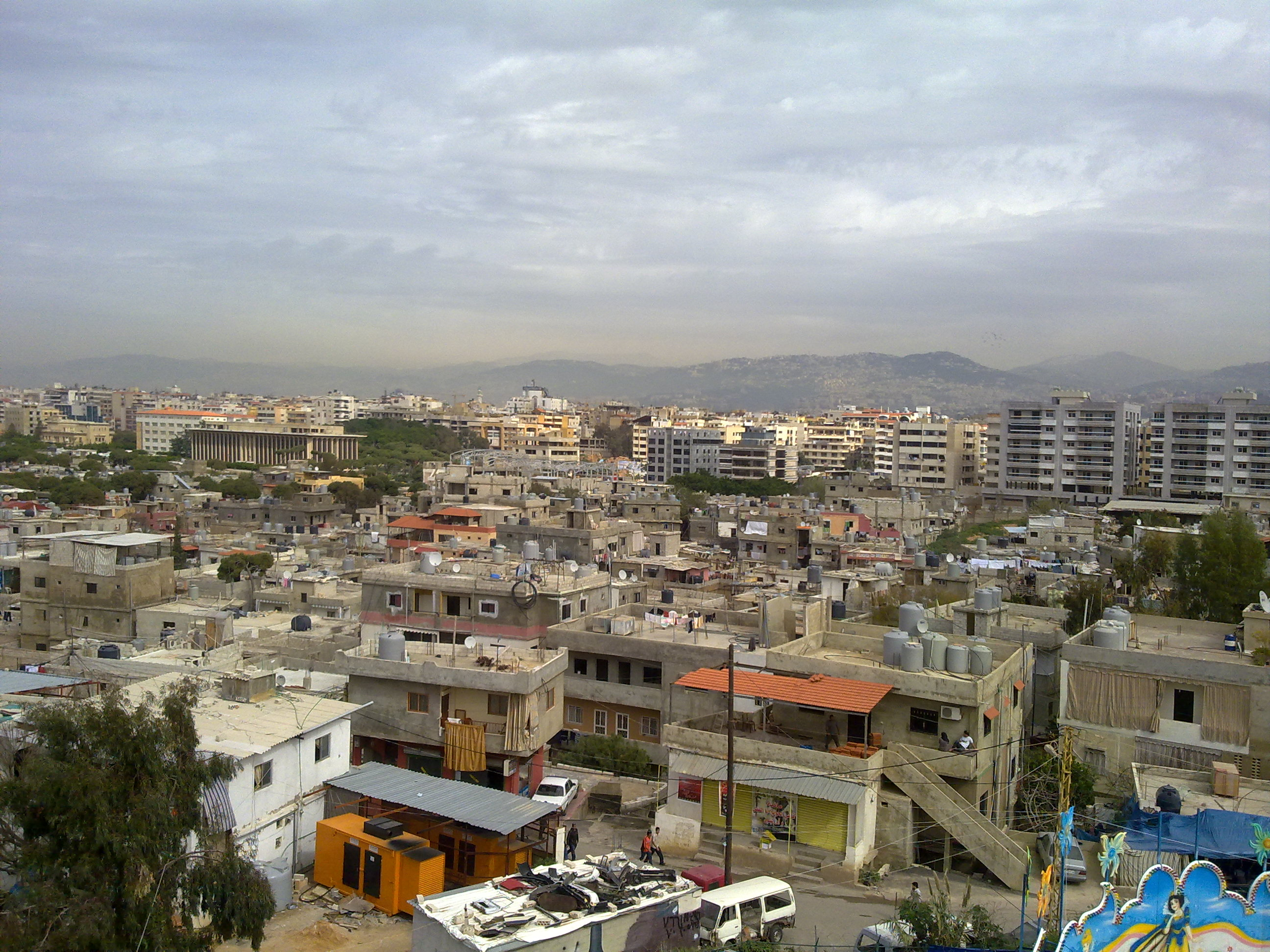
- Baabda skyline

- Location within Lebanon
- Coordinates: 33°50′03″N 35°32′37″E
- Country: Lebanon
- Governorate: Mount Lebanon Governorate
- District: Baabda District

Government
  - Mayor: Antoine El Helou (Independent)

Population (2006)
  - Total: 84,900
- Metro population
- Time zone: UTC+2 (EET)
  - Summer (DST): UTC+3 (EEST)
- Dialing code: +961

Baabda (Arabic: بعبدا, romanized: Bʿabdā) is the capital city of Baabda District and Mount Lebanon Governorate, western Lebanon. Baabda was also the capital city of the autonomous Ottoman Mount Lebanon that existed from 1861 to 1918.

Baabda is home to the Italian, Japanese, Jordanian, Polish, Ukrainian, Romanian, Indonesian, Spanish and other embassies. It is also home to the Ministry of Defense and other administrative offices. Baabda is also known for its Seraglio.

In 1956, Baabda Palace was built in Baabda as the official presidential residence, on a hill overlooking Beirut. It remains the residence of the president of Lebanon. The first president to reside there was Charles Helou from 1964 to 1970.

From 1988 to 1990, Lebanon's interim prime minister, Michel Aoun took up residence in the Baabda Palace surrounded by loyal soldiers. During the War of Liberation, Syrian forces attacked it on October 13, 1990, forcing Aoun to seek shelter in the French Embassy in Baabda. Eight days later, Dany Chamoun, son of former President Camille Chamoun, was assassinated with his family in their apartment in the city.

== Demographics ==
In 2014, Christians made up 75.57% and Muslims made up 24.13% of registered voters in Baabda. 59.02% of the voters were Maronite Catholics and 19.47% were Sunni Muslims.

== Gallery ==
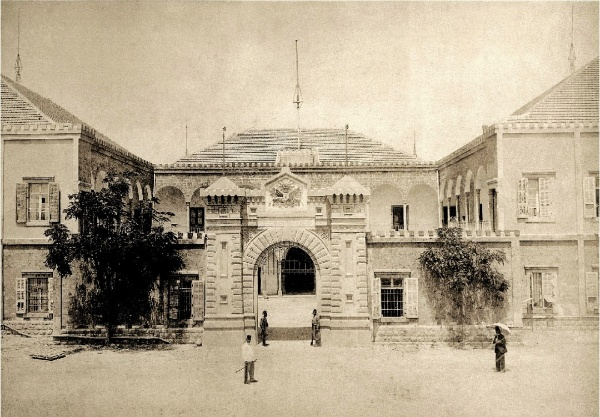

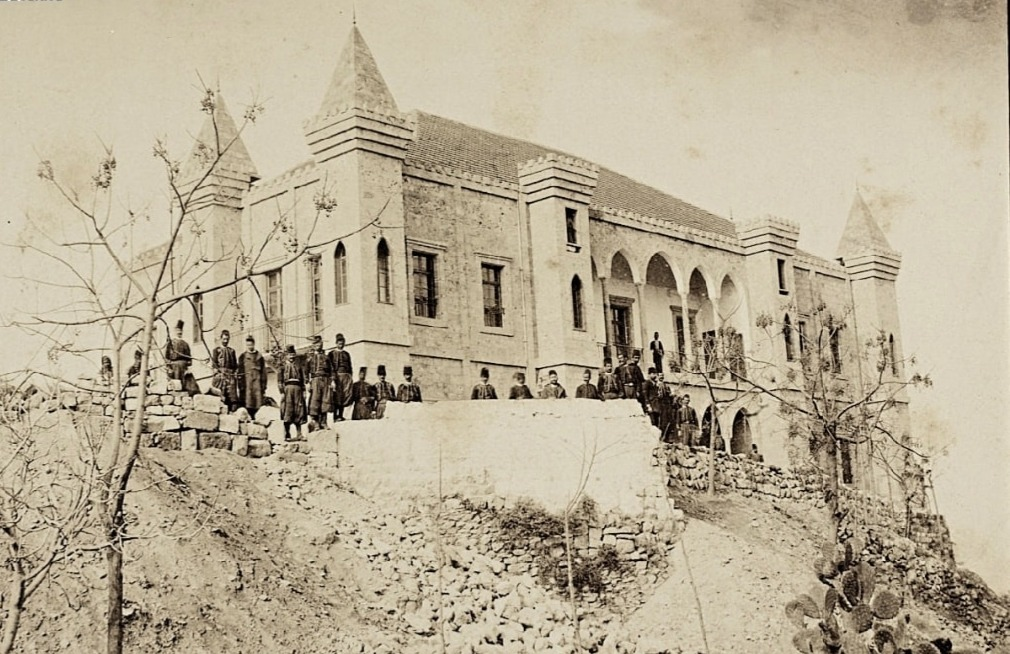

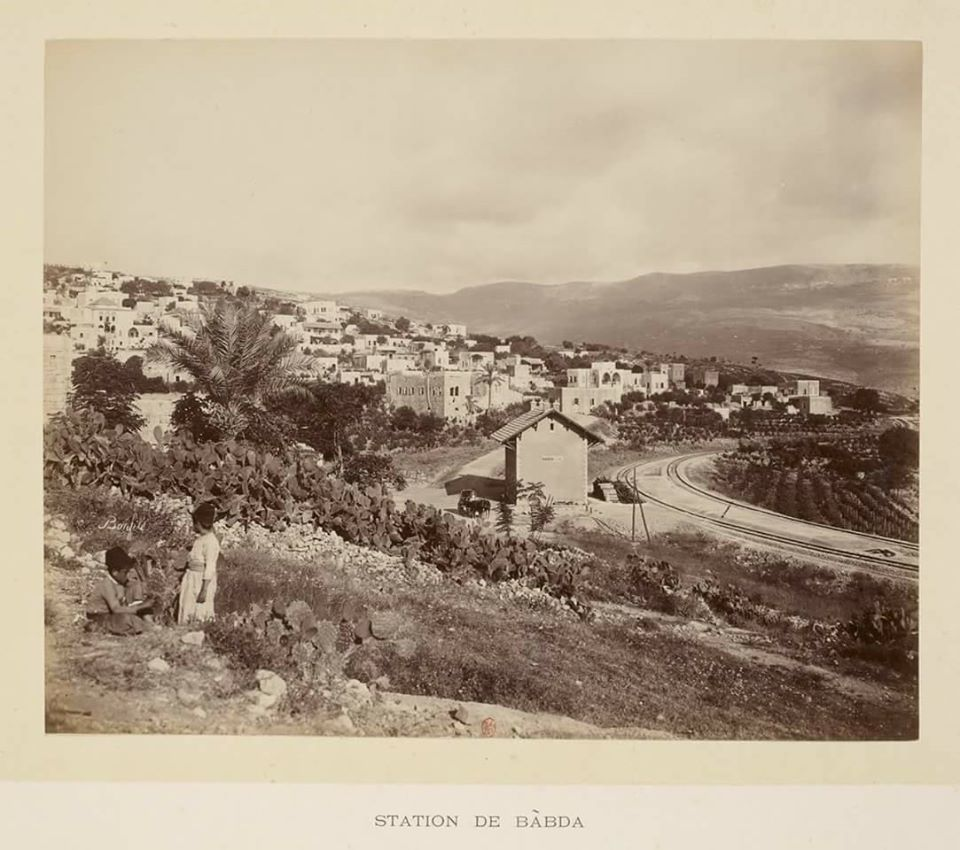

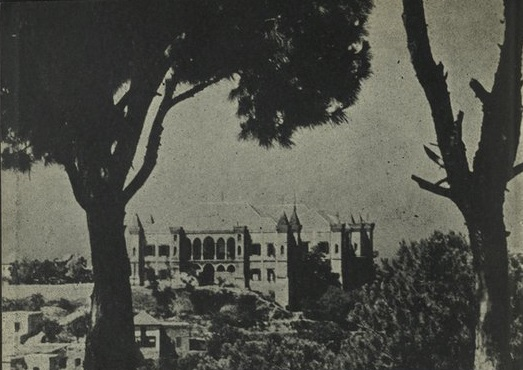
