= Les Illuminés =

Les Illuminés, ou Les Précurseurs du Socialisme (Note: Also sometimes subtitled as Récits et Portraits) is a collection of narratives or essays by the French poet and author Gérard de Nerval published in 1852. In 2022, a complete translation by Peter Valente was published by Wakefield Press under the title The Illuminated, or The Precursors of Socialism: Tales and Portraits.

The book consists of six narratives relating the adventures and mishaps of historical figures whose lives reflected different aspects of Nerval’s own experiences. It is a male counterpart to his Les Filles du feu. The concerns of socialism in the eighteenth century and the French Revolution underline most of the narratives.

== Contents ==
- "La Bibliothèque de Mon Oncle," a short introduction
- "Le Roi de Bicêtre"
- "Histoire de l’Abbé de Bucquoy"
- "Les Confidences de Nicolas"
- "Jacques Cazotte", a French writer, author of The Devil in Love, unjustly guillotined during the French revolution at the age of 72. He inspired E. T. A. Hoffmann and Charles Nodier.
- "Cagliostro"
- "Quintus Aucler", the revolution-era neopagan Gabriel André Aucler
