= Mandaloun =

Type of window used in stately mansions

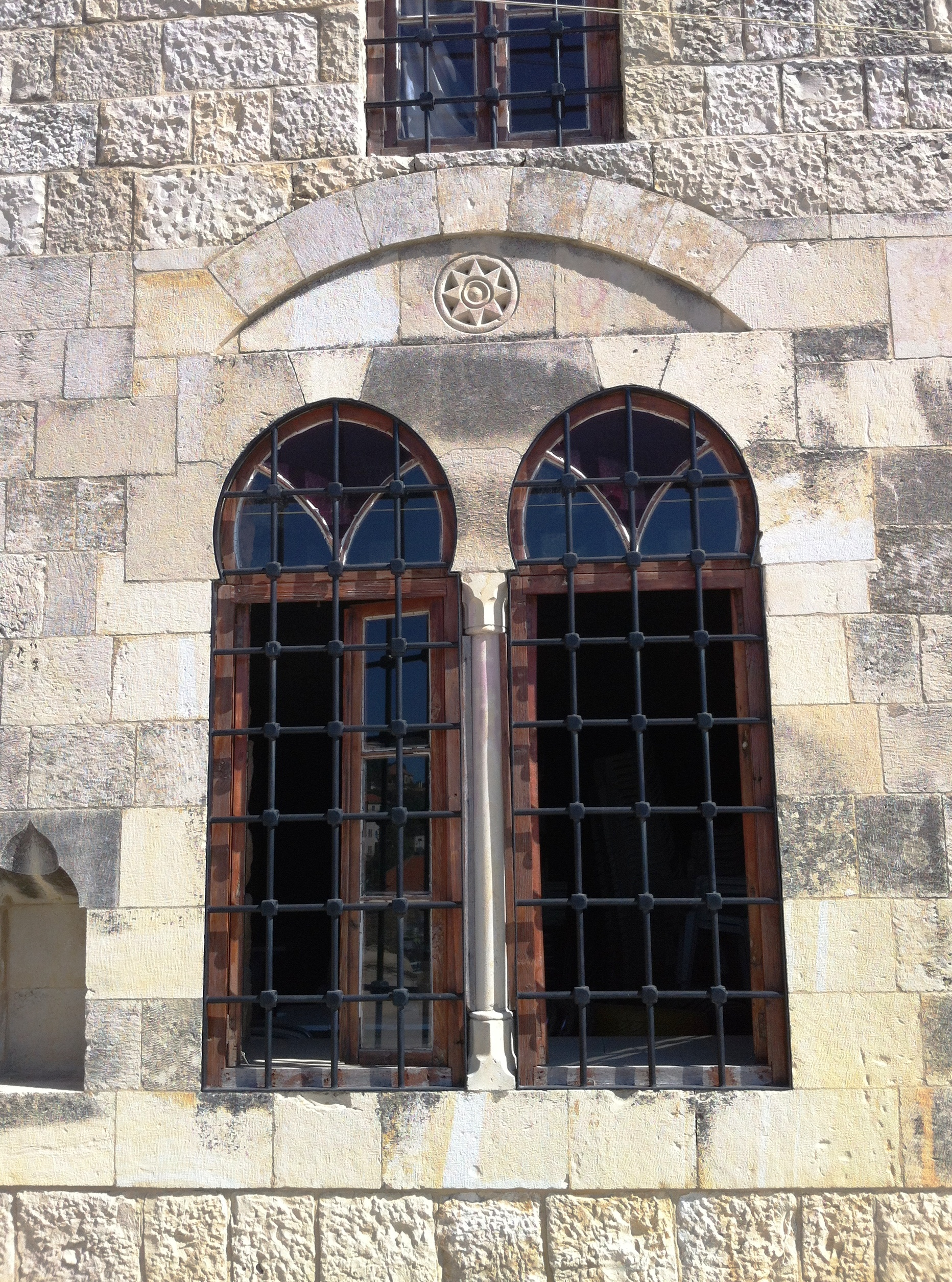
Mandaloun of the 17th-century Deir el Qamar Synagogue.

The mandaloun (Arabic: مندلون) is a term given to a type of mullioned window. The mandaloun is an element of the traditional architecture of Lebanon that first appeared in the 17th-century stately mansions and later in the vernacular houses of the mountains of Lebanon.

== Etymology ==
The term mandaloun is of unknown origin and does not derive from any Arabic verbal root. Friedrich Ragette, an author of a book on Lebanese architecture, indicates an Italian origin, and links the term to the Italian mandolino, a musical instrument in the lute family. Ragette inferred that the mandaloun's disposition and location was favorable to the instrument player, thus the naming. This theory is reinforced by the fact that Italian was the most widely spoken foreign language by the notables as remarked by Gérard de Nerval in his 1851 voyage account, Voyage to the Orient.

Le prince me parla longtemps de sa famille, des voyages que son grand-père avait faits en Europe et des honneurs qu'il y avait obtenus. Il s'exprimait fort bien en italien, comme la plupart des émirs et des cheiks du Liban...

== History ==
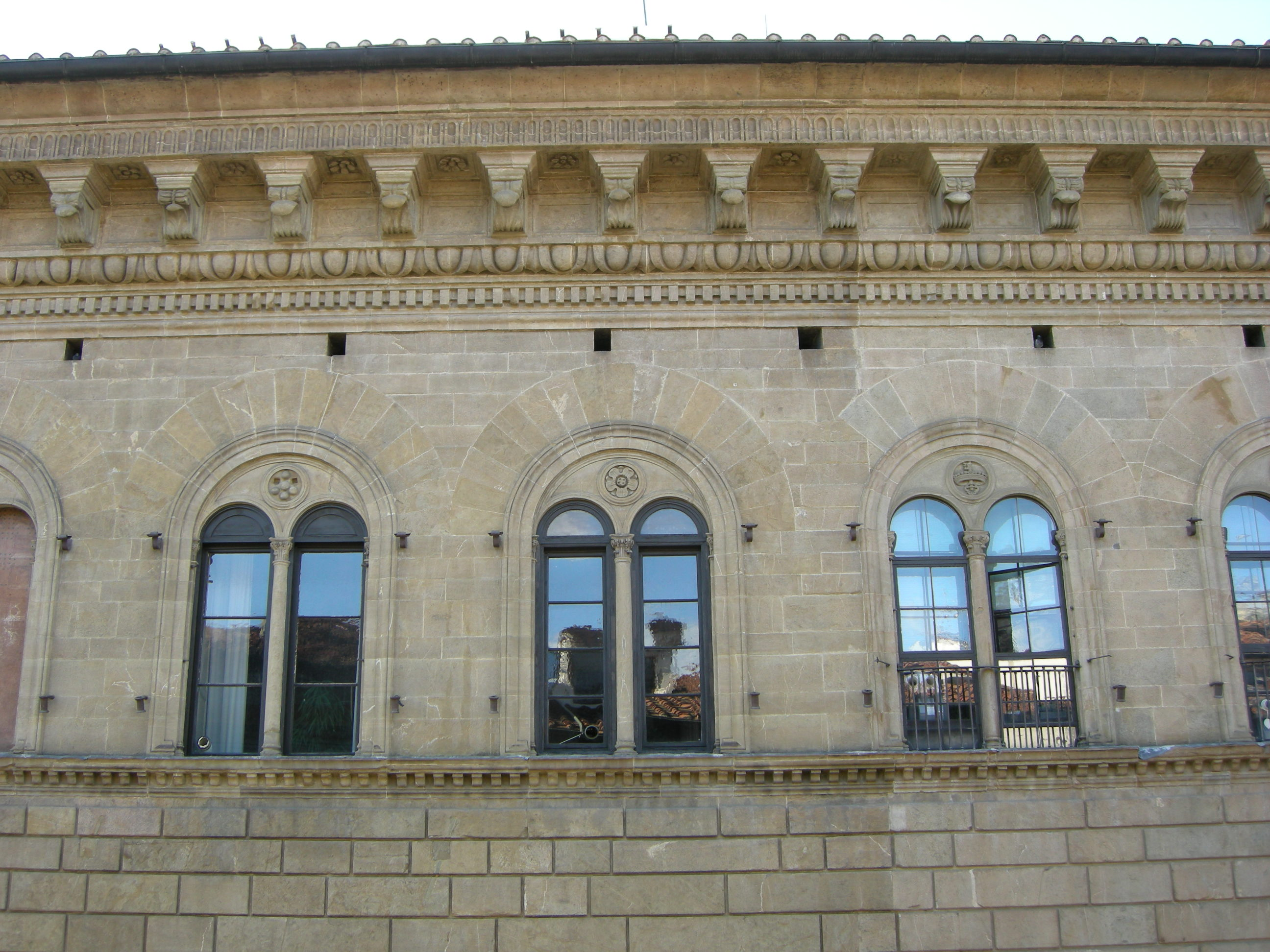
Mullioned windows, known as biforas at the Palazzo Medici Riccardi, where Fakhreddin spent the last year of his exile.

In 1608, prince Fakhr al-Din II of Lebanon concluded a secret economic and military alliance with the Grand Duke of Tuscany against the Ottoman hegemony. Alarmed, the Ottomans dispatched the Muhafiz of Damascus to mount an attack on Lebanon in order to reduce Fakhr al-Din's growing power. Fakhr-al-Din chose to seek exile in Italy from 1613 until 1618 where he was hosted by Cosimo II de' Medici, Grand Duke of Tuscany. Fakhr-al-Din stayed in Pope Leo X's apartment at the Palazzo Vecchio and later in the Palazzo Medici Riccardi; he was also received by Cosimo II in the Palazzo Pitti where he was exposed to Florentine architecture particularly the biforas, a type of mullioned windows that garnered the facades of the Florentine Renaissance palaces.

Before returning from exile, Fakhr al-Din appealed for a long list of artisans at the court of the Medici but only four came to Lebanon. The artisans who arrived in 1631 included Cioli, a sculptor, and Fagni an engineer. These artisans who introduced elements of Italian architecture, including the bifora had to leave Lebanon precipitately in 1633 when Fakhr al-Din was deposed. One of the earliest known monuments to hold a variant of the bifore which would be known locally as mandaloun was Burj al-Kashaf, a watch tower built by Fakhr al-Din at the outskirts of the walled city of Beirut; the tower was destroyed in 1870.

== Description ==
The mandaloun was built with local limestone and consists of a vertical, fine column forming a division between two units of a window. The traditional mandaloun is always surmounted by a discharging arch and is often coupled with hanging flower boxes. Mandalouns were usually located in a prominent part of houses and palaces.

== Bibliography ==
- Semaan Kfoury (1999). Maisons libanaises (in French). Éditions ALBA, Université de Balamand. ISBN 978-9953-452-41-8.
- Gebran Yacoub (2003). معجم الهندسة المعمارية في لبنان في القرن العشرين. Alphamedia.
- Gérard de Nerval (1851). Voyage en Orient (in French). Charpentier.
- Hafez, Chehab (1 August 1994). Muqarnas: An Annual on Islamic Art and Architecture. BRILL. p. 117. ISBN 978-90-04-10070-1.
- Friedrich Ragette (1974). Architecture in Lebanon: the Lebanese house during the 18th and 19th centuries. Caravan Books. ISBN 978-0-88206-041-5.
