= Palace of Emir Ahmad Shihab =

- قصر الأمير أحمد بن حيدر الشهابي (Arabic)
- Palace of Emir Ahmad Shihab, later Palace of Jirjis Baz, built in 1755 for the wife of Emir Ahmad bin Haydar al-Shihabi, as seen from Deir el Qamar's main square in 2010

- Location within Lebanon
- 33°41′51″N 35°33′57″E
- Location: Deir al-Qamar, Lebanon

History
- Built: 1755
- Built for: Ahmad ibn Haidar Shihab and his wife, Princess Khansaa Abillama

Site notes
- Architectural styles: Lebanese architecture, Ottoman architecture, Mamluk architecture

The Palace of Emir Ahmad Shihab (Arabic: قصر الأمير أحمد الشهابي) or Palace of Jirjis (or Gergis) Baz (Arabic: قصر جرجس باز; also known as the Palace of Emir Ahmad ibn Haydar al-Shihabi, Arabic: قصر الأمير أحمد بن حيدر الشهابي, and Qasr Um Dabbus Arabic: قصر أم دبوس) is an 18th-century palace in Deir al-Qamar, Lebanon. The palace was built in 1755 by Emir Ahmad ibn Haydar al-Shihabi for his wife, Khansaa Abillama. It is among the largest historic courtyard houses in Deir al-Qamar and is characterized by its two towers, richly decorated entrance portal, mandaloun windows, internal courtyard, and private hammam. In 1800, it was acquired by Sheikh Jirjis Baz, one of Emir Bashir II's principal administrators, and has since become associated with the Baz family.

== Names ==
The palace (or Qasr) has been known by several names: It is commonly referred to in historical works as the Palace of Emir Ahmad Shihab or Palace of Emir Ahmad ibn Haydar al‑Shihabi after its builder. Following its acquisition by Sheikh Jirjis (Gergis) Baz in 1800, the residence became widely known as the Palace of Jirjis Baz, or the Palace of Sheikh Jirjis Baz. The Austrian architect and scholar Friedrich Ragette referred to it in his 1974 work on architecture in Lebanon as the Baz-Honein Palace, due to the residence's association at the time with the Baz and Honein families. The palace is also known locally as Qasr Um Dabbus, a name derived from the nickname of Khansaa bint Fares Abillama, wife of Emir Ahmad ibn Haydar al‑Shihabi.

== Location ==
The palace stands on the western side of Al Midan (Dany Chamoun) Square, the historic main square of Deir al-Qamar.

== History ==
The palace was built by Emir Ahmad ibn Haydar al-Shihabi, a second cousin to Emir Bashir II al-Shihabi, for his wife Khansaa bint Fares Abillama of Baskinta; it was completed in 1755 based on a commemorative stone inscription placed above one of the entrances to the complex. In 1800, ownership of the palace passed to Sheikh Jirjis Baz, (Note: In the memoirs of Rustum Baz, Jirjis Baz is identified by the sobriquet "Abu Assaf".) a Maronite, and one of Emir Bashir II's chief administrators, who acquired it from the widow of Emir Ahmad for a sum of forty thousand kuruş. In 1807, Sheikh Jirjis Baz and his brother Abd al-Ahad Baz were accused of plotting against Emir Bashir II and were killed on the emir's orders. According to the memoirs of Rustum Baz, the accusations stemmed from a conspiracy orchestrated by Emir Hasan Shihab and Sheikh Bashir Jumblatt, following which the emir seized the Baz family's properties. (Note: On the reasons for the assassination of the Baz brothers, Rustum Baz writes about a dispute between Jirjis Baz (Abu Assaf) and Sheikh Bashir Jumblatt. During a meeting with Emir Bashir and Sheikh Bashir Jumblatt, Jirjis Baz defended the rights of Christian villagers from al-Dibbiyeh and openly contradicted Jumblatt, who reportedly left with resentment. This incident is explicitly presented as one of the causes of the later conspiracy. The second reason is Jirjis' opposition to Emir Hasan Shihab's new taxation proposal. Rustum Baz states that Emir Hasan wanted to carry out a land survey and taxation reform affecting the Khazin family estates. He claims that Jirjis Baz intervened against the measure, which angered Hasan. Rustum then writes that Emir Hasan and Sheikh Bashir Jumblatt jointly sought a way to eliminate the Baz family and the sons of Emir Yusuf, recruiting supporters and preparing a plot against them.) The New Zealand historian William Harris offers a more contextualized interpretation: Jirjis Baz had emerged as one of the most influential figures in Mount Lebanon during the early years of Emir Bashir II's rule, managing relations with Ottoman governors and exercising considerable political authority. However, tensions had developed between the two men. Harris writes that Bashir increasingly resented Baz's influence and perceived interference in family and administrative affairs, while several Druze leaders also viewed him as a threat. In 1807, Bashir Shihab secretly allied with Bashir Jumblatt and other Druze notables against him. On 15 May 1807, Baz was killed in the palace by retainers acting on the emir's orders. At the same time, his brother was killed in Jbeil and the sons of Yusuf Shihab were seized. After the seizure, Emir Bashir hosted the Wali of Egypt Ibrahim Pasha in the palace. Sitt Lulu, the widow of Sheikh Jirjis appealed to the Ottoman sultan, who issued a firman (Ottoman royal decree) restoring the palace to her. The residence subsequently returned to the Baz family and has remained in its ownership since.

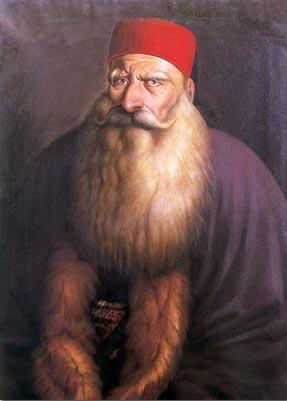
Daoud Corm's portrait of Emir Bashir Shihab II, derived from a posthumous mask of the emir commissioned by Rustum Baz after Bashir's death in Istanbul in 1850

Following the 1807 killings, Elias Baz, son of Tanous and nephew of Jirjis and Abd al‑Ahad Baz, fled to Tripoli and later Damascus. According to the memoirs of Rustum Baz, Emir Bashir II subsequently reconciled with him, providing written guarantees of safety, financial compensation, and a position in his service, after which Elias became one of the emir's agents and revenue collectors. Daoud Baz, a son of Sheikh Jirjis, was administrator to the emir. Another family member, Rustum, the son of Elias Baz, accompanied Bashir II into exile in Constantinople and arranged for a death mask and paintings to be made of the emir, preserving the only known image of Bashir II.

The palace briefly served an educational function during the early Protestant missionary activities in Mount Lebanon. According to the memoirs of the American missionary and educator Cornelius Van Dyck, following meetings in Beirut in April 1841 between American missionaries and a Druze delegation that included members of the Jumblatt, Nakad, Imad, Talhuq, Abd al-Malik, and Arslan families, local Druze leaders requested the establishment of schools. The missionary educator William Walcott rented the Palace of Jirjis Baz and opened a day school for Druze children there with the assistance of Reverend Geiger, an American teacher who had recently arrived from the United States. Van Dyck noted that the mission's presence in Deir al-Qamar relied heavily on the protection and support of Druze notables and faced strong opposition from sections of the Maronite clergy.

== Description ==
1836 engraving of Deir al-Qamar and Beiteddine. The palace of Ahmad Shibab is visible in the center left.

Ragette describes the residence as a iwan with a courtyard house of "almost palatial dimensions". The building's main west facing facade comprises a central block flanked by two three-story square towers. The western elevation contains the principal entrance, consisting of an elaborately decorated portal recessed within a rectangular frame. This portal belongs to a broader architectural tradition found in the palaces of Deir al‑Qamar; these entrances display characteristics associated with Mamluk architecture, particularly the use of ablaq (alternating courses of light and colored stone), a decorative treatment also seen in Mamluk monuments elsewhere in the eastern Mediterranean. The entrance opens to an entryway with an L-shaped bench, where the servants of the palace's visitors waited. A small door connects the entryway to the central courtyard.

The northern tower incorporates a secondary entrance and is pierced by several arched and rectangular openings. At its upper level, the tower has a mandaloun (a type of mullioned window typical of the area) surmounted by a circular oculus. The southern tower features a mandaloun at the second floor, while its uppermost storey incorporates an open gallery formed by tall pointed arches. A third mandaloun and a projecting wooden mashrabiyya-type bay (kiosk) extend from the southern side of the tower. The kiosk and its colored bay window identify the seat reserved for the highest-ranking occupant of the reception space.

The southern elevation's ground-floor begins with a gallery of three pointed arches occupying the lower level of the southern tower. The middle storey is pierced by five openings, including a mandaloun. Above, the projecting wooden kiosk forms the most prominent feature of the upper level of the southern tower. The southern elevation of the northern tower contains by a gallery of two broad pointed arches opening onto an upper storey. Adjacent to the northern tower is the domed hammam, whose dome is visible behind the main structure. The hammam opens to the palace's garden.

The eastern elevation contains a secondary entrance reached by an external flight of stairs; this side also provides access to the hammam (private bath) complex. The eastern façade of the northern tower is pierced by a mandaloun. An internal courtyard measuring about 15 m × 15 m (49 ft × 49 ft) is dominated by an east-facing iwan distinguished by a pointed arch of substantial height. The courtyard is flanked on three of its sides by the complex' living quarters and the east side is occupied by the hammam.

== In local lore and popular culture ==
Midan (Dany Chamoun) Square around January 2025. The palace of Emir Ahmad rises in the background with its restored kiosk.

The palace appears in Le Couvent de la Lune - L'anneau de l'Emir, a historical novel by the Lebanese novelist Carole Dagher set in nineteenth-century Lebanon.

=== Local lore ===
According to local tradition, the palace is associated with Khansaa bint Fares Abillama of Baskinta. The story relates that she acquired the nickname Umm Dabbus ("Mother of the Pin") after reportedly defending herself from a thief at the age of twelve with a hairpin or other sharp object. Another version of the story attributes her name to a jewel-encrusted pin she wore. Khansaa married Ahmad ibn Haydar al-Shihabi, with whom she had two children who died in infancy. Following their deaths, she is said to have regarded her main residence in Deir al-Qamar facing the Shalut spring as ill-fated and urged her husband to construct a new palace in Deir al-Qamar. When he initially refused, she went to Baakline and incited the public against him, and refused to return home until he eventually agreed and commissioned the residence. The same tradition maintains that the emir subsequently married one of Khansaa's cousins in the hope of securing a male heir. Khansaa is said to have left Deir al-Qamar and settled at the Vieux Couvent of Aintoura, Keserwan, where she spent the remainder of her life. She was buried in the pine grove overlooking the present-day Saint Joseph School of Aintoura.

== Conservation status and access ==
The palace is situated within the historic center of Deir al-Qamar, an area designated as an archaeological and heritage area by Lebanese Republic Decree No. 2837 of 16 March 1945, which placed several historic buildings near the Ma'nid and Shihab palaces under protection. The palace remains privately owned by descendants of the Baz family and has generally not been open to public visits.

== Sources ==
=== Sources ===
- Altaner, Jan (2019). "The Baz Family – German Nobility in Lebanon". Goethe Institute. Archived from the original on 2026-02-08.
- Azar, Linda (2007-10-08). "دير القمر ... دُرّة دارت عليها النار". Alrai-media (in Arabic).
- Baz, Rustum (1955). Bustani, Fuad Afram (ed.). "مذكرات رستم باز - Mudhakkirāt Rustum Bāz" [Memoirs of Rustum Baz]. Noor Book (in Arabic). Beirut: Lebanese University Press.
- Charqouna (2025-06-11). "قصر الشيخ جرجس باز الكبير في دير القمر". CHARQOUNA (in Arabic). Archived from the original on 2026-10-20.
- Dagher, Carole (2002). Le Couvent de la lune. Internet Archive. Paris: Plon. ISBN 978-2-259-19438-9.
- Haddad, Elie (2007-06-26). "Between Myth and Reality: the 'Tuscan Influence' on the Architecture of Mount Lebanon in the Emirate Period". Journal of Design History. 20: 161–171. doi:10.1093/jdh/epm010.
- Harb, Antoine Khoury (2001). The Maronites.
- Harris, William W. (2012-07-19). Lebanon: A History, 600-2011. OUP USA. ISBN 978-0-19-518111-1.
- Lammens, Henri (1921). La Syrie : précis historique. Beyrouth : Impr. Catholique.
- LBCI Lebanon (2024-01-24). لبنان بقصة - ما هي قصة الأميرة "إم دبوس"؟ [Lebanon in a Story - What is the story of Princess 'Um Dabbus'?]. Charles el-Hayek, Yazbek Wehbe – via YouTube.
- Lee, Jessica (2014-04-10). Beirut Footprint Focus Guide: Includes Baalbek, Byblos, Chouf Mountains, Mount Lebanon. Footprint Travel Guides. ISBN 978-1-909268-91-3.
- middleeast.com (2002). "Shouf Region". www.middleeast.com.
- Moutran, Nadra (1916). La Syrie de demain: France et Syrie, Syrie proprement dite, gouvernement et ... (in French). Plon-Nourrit et cie.
- Mufarrej, Tony (2002). "دير القمر - آثار حقبة الإمارة" [Deir al-Qamar – Relics of the Emirate Era]. موسوعة قرى ومدن لبنان [The Encyclopedia of the Villages and Towns of Lebanon]. Vol. 11. Beirut: Nobilis.
- Nasr, Munir (2006). Lebanon through the lens of Munir Nasr. Beirut: Arab Printing Press. ISBN 978-9953-0-0345-0.
- Paksoy, Taylan (2026-01-02). "Legacy of Emir Bashir II: power elites, trans-confessionalism, and nationhood in modern Lebanon". Mediterranean Historical Review. 41 (1). Routledge: 51–72. doi:10.1080/09518967.2026.2650603. ISSN 0951-8967.
- Piperino, Roberto (2021). "Deir al-Qamar in Lebanon". www.romeartlover.it. Archived from the original on 2025-12-06.
- Ragette, Friedrich (1974). Architecture in Lebanon - The Lebanese House During the 18th and 19th Centuries. Beirut: American University of Beirut. pp. 80–82, 144 (E46).
- Rustom, Asad (1969). لبنان في عهد الأمراء الشّهابيّين [Lebanon under the Shihab Emirs]. الغرر الحسان في أخبار أبناء الزمان (in Arabic). Vol. 2. Beirut: Lebanese University Press. pp. 501–502.
- Zaydan, Jurji (1 February 1906). "مذكرات الدكتور فان ديك" [The Memoirs of Dr. Van Dyck]. Al-Hilal (in Arabic). 15 (5): 273–280.
