= Michał Czajkowski =

Ottoman-Polish official (1804–1886)

Mehmet Sadyk Pasha
- Sadik Basza
- Illustration of Pasha by Antoni Oleszczyński. From the National Library of Poland's collections
- Born: Michał Czajkowski; 29 September 1804; Halchyn, Volhynia Governorate, Russian Empire
- Died: 18 January 1886 (aged 81); Kiyev, Kiyev Governorate, Russian Empire
- Parents: Stanisław Czajkowski (father); Petronela Głębocka (mother)

Mehmet Sadyk Pasha (29 September 1804 – 18 January 1886; Turkish: Mehmed Sâdık Paşa; Polish: Sadik Basza), born Michał Czajkowski , was a Polish writer and political émigré of distant Cossack heritage who worked both for the resurrection of Poland and also for the reestablishment of a Cossack state.

== Early life ==
Czajkowski was born in Halchyn (Polish: Halczyniec) to Stanisław Czajkowski and Petronela Głębocka, in a szlachta family settled in the Ukraine for several generations. The Czajkowskis had origins in Czajki in Masovia, while the Głębockis were an old family from Kuyavia. On his maternal side, he was a descendant of the Ukrainian Cossack Hetman Ivan Briukhovetsky (reigned 1663–68). Her family cultivated the memory of Głębocki who married the Hetman's granddaughter. Czajkowski was raised in the spirit of the szlachta and Cossackdom. He participated in the Polish insurrection of 1830-31. After the failure of this uprising, he went into exile in France, where he developed his ideology of the resurrection of Cossackdom and wrote several novels on this theme. Very popular at this time, some of them were translated into several languages including French and German. In general, in his early writings, Czajkowski saw no conflict between Polish and Cossack interests and romanticized the history of Ukrainian-Polish relations.

== France and Turkey ==
During his French period, Czajkowski briefly collaborated with the radically oriented Polish Democratic Society, and then with the moderate Confederation of the Polish People, before going over to the conservative Polish emigre faction led by Prince Adam Jerzy Czartoryski called the 'Hotel Lambert', after the Prince's residence in Paris. At Czartoryski's bidding, Czajkowski went to the Ottoman Empire where he was active in Bosnia and Serbia and supported anti-Russian activities in the Caucasus. In the years following the unsuccessful revolutions of 1848, he helped arrange political asylum for refugee Polish and Hungarian revolutionaries. Russian and Austrian efforts to have him extradited back to his homeland and conflicts with Paris led to his eventual conversion to Islam and his new name Sadyk Pasha. He thereupon organized an Ottoman Cossack Brigade to fight against the Russians. Czajkowski's Ottoman Cossack unit actually saw some action in the Balkans during the Crimean War but never got to invade the Ukraine from the south which was the original intention of its organizers.

== Return to the Ukraine ==
Although Czajkowski returned from the war with honours and was able to live a comfortable life in the Ottoman Empire, his restless nature could never be completely satisfied. His differences with the Hotel Lambert had steadily increased over the years and he was becoming more and more estranged from the Polish political diaspora. He was also frustrated by the failure of his larger Cossack project. In 1872, the Russian government offered him an amnesty, and in part under the influence of his third wife, a young Greek girl, he accepted the Russian offer, converted to Orthodoxy, returned to the Ukraine and chose to live in Kiyev. During this period he wrote his very extensive memoirs. His young wife proved unfaithful, however, and in 1886 a dispirited Czajkowski took his own life.

== Legacy ==
Czajkowski is remembered as a great Cossack enthusiast, a contemporary and friend of other prominent Polish romantics like the poet Adam Mickiewicz, and a leading member of the Ukrainian School of Polish literature. His writings had a profound influence upon younger generations of aristocratic Poles from right-bank Ukraine and boyhood reading of them probably influenced the future prominent historians Volodymyr Antonovych and Vyacheslav Lypynsky to go over to the Ukrainian independence movement.

His son, Władysław Czajkowski, became an Ottoman official and served as governor in Mount-Lebanon.

== Famous works ==
- Powieści Kozackie (transl. Cossack Tales, 1837)
- Wernyhora (1838)
- Kirdzali (1839)
- Owruczanin (transl. The Man from Ovruch, 1841)
- Ukrainki (transl. Ukrainian Women, 1841)
