= L'Artiste =

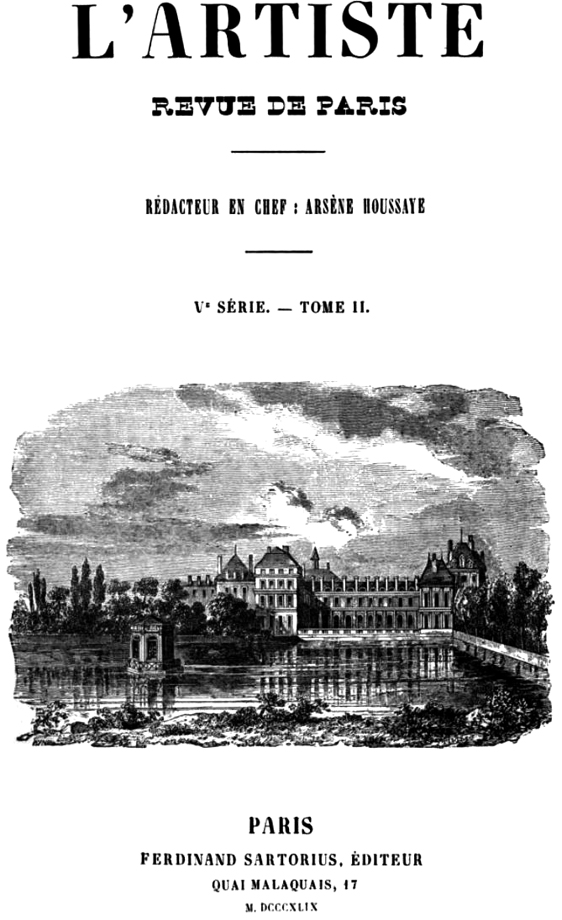
- Frequency: Weekly
- Founder: Achille Ricourt
- Founded: 1831
- Final issue: 1904
- Country: France
- Based in: Paris
- Language: French

L’Artiste was a weekly illustrated review published in Paris from 1831 to 1904, supplying "the richest single source of contemporary commentary on artists, exhibitions and trends from the Romantic era to the end of the nineteenth century."

== History ==
L'Artiste was founded in 1831 by Achille Ricourt with financing provided by the businessman Aimé-Joseph Brame. In 1843, it was purchased by Arsène Houssaye.

Originally, L'Artiste addressed fine arts and literature, but by 1859, literature became its primary concern. It later absorbed the Revue de Paris.

Important editors included A. Ricourt, H. Delaunay, and Arsène Houssaye. Notably, it published works by Honoré de Balzac, Gérard de Nerval, Théophile Gautier, Jules Janin, Théodore de Banville, Émile Zola, Henri Murger, Jules Champfleury, Charles Baudelaire, Joseph Méry, Eugène Sue and Alphonse Esquiros.
