= Baabda Palace =

Residence of the President of Lebanon

Coordinates: 33°50′30″N 35°32′22″E

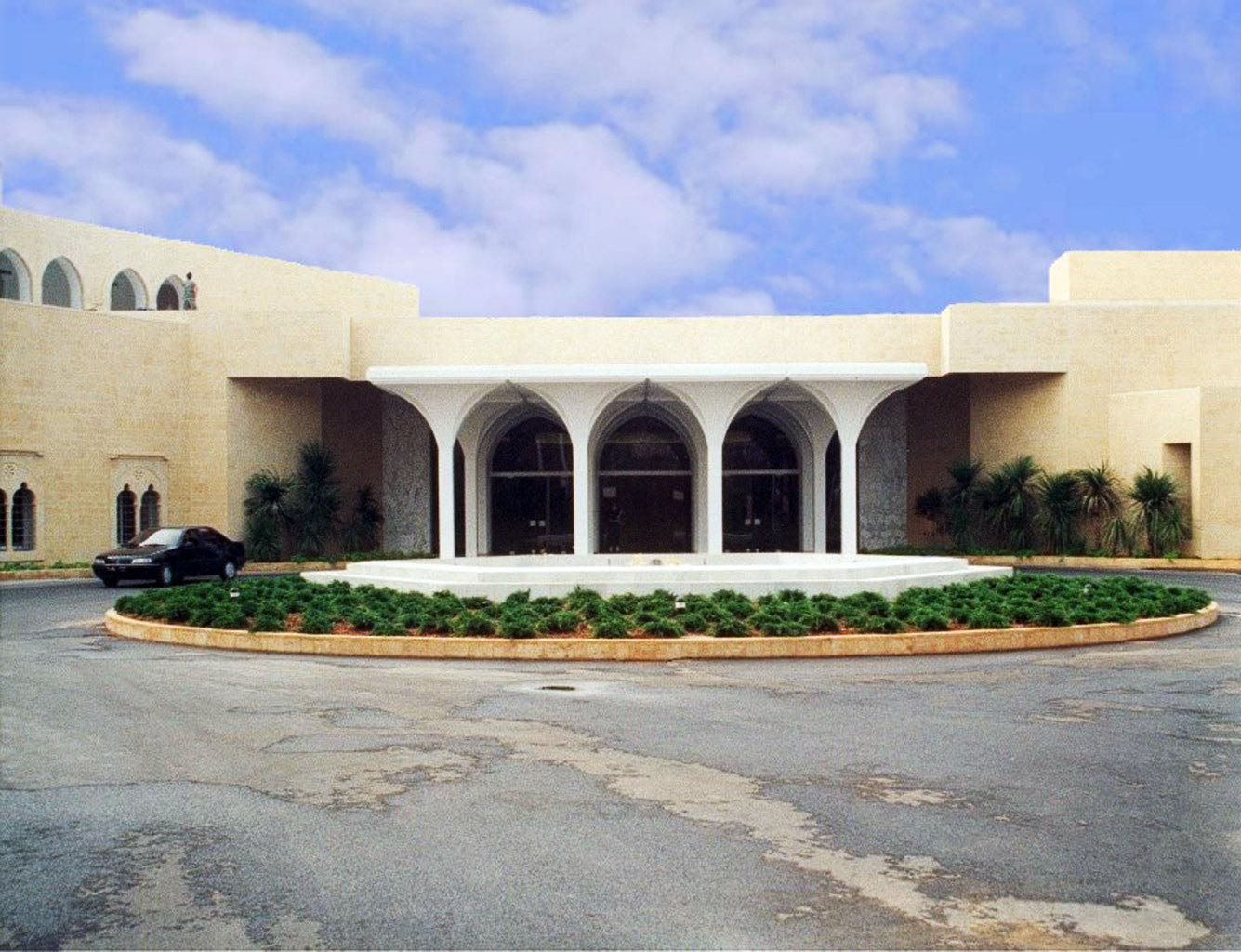

Baabda Palace (or Presidential Palace, French: Palais présidentiel de Baabda, Arabic: قصر بعبدا), is the official residence of the President of Lebanon. The palace was built in 1956 on a hill in the mountain town of Baabda overlooking the Lebanese capital, Beirut. The first President to reside in it was President Charles Helou.

== Ministerial meetings ==
The Baabda palace is surrounded by the Ministry of Defense and various other military posts. It started hosting ministerial meetings every other week after the usual venue of the ministerial meetings was abandoned due to security reasons in mid-2005. Now, the ministerial meetings are held in alternating order at Baabda Palace and the Grand Serail.

During his two years, 1988–1990, as Lebanon’s alternative Prime Minister Michel Aoun took up residence in the Baabda Palace surrounded by those troops from the Lebanese army who had remained loyal to him. The palace was subsequently severely damaged by the military conflicts of these two years. It was restored in the early nineties and President Elias Al Hrawi moved into it from his temporary presidential quarters.

== See also ==
- The Insignia of the Republican Guard (Lebanon)
- List of presidents of Lebanon
- Beiteddine Palace
