= Les Filles du feu =

Collection of works by Gérard de Nerval

Les Filles du Feu
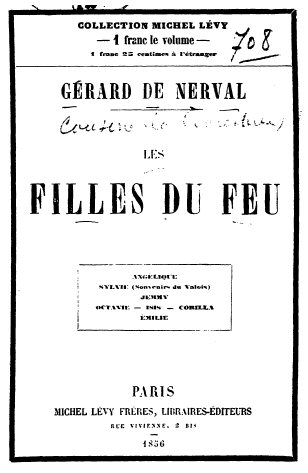
- Title page from 1856 edition of Les Filles du Feu
- Author: Gérard de Nerval
- Language: French
- Genre: Short story collection
- Publication date: 1854
- Publication place: France
- Media type: Print (Hardback & Paperback)

Les Filles du feu (French pronunciation: [le fij dy fø], The Daughters of Fire) is a collection of short prose works, poetry and a play published by the French poet Gérard de Nerval in January 1854, a year before his death. During 1853, Nerval had suffered three nervous breakdowns and spent five months in an asylum. He saw Les Filles du feu as an opportunity to show the public, his friends and his father that he was sane, though except for the introduction all of the pieces in Les Filles du feu had been published previously: "Angélique" in Les Faux Saulniers (1850), "Sylvie" in La Revue des Deux Mondes (1853), and "Émilie", "Jemmy", "Isis" and "Octavie" in diverse reviews.

The precise meaning of the title, which Nerval chose just before publication, is uncertain. Scholars have identified its source as the ceremonies of Irish vestal virgins described in Michelet's Histoire de France (1833) or a poem in a novel by Alexandre Dumas, La Tulipe noire (1850).

== Introduction ==
Les Filles du feu is dedicated to Alexandre Dumas, Nerval's friend and collaborator on works for the theater. The previous December, Dumas had published an essay attributing Nerval's mental crises to an excess of creative imagination, an exaggerated emotional identification with the historic figures he wrote about. In his introduction to the volume, Nerval elaborates on Dumas' analysis, describing how their old friend Charles Nodier once claimed he had been guillotined during the French Revolution. He discusses how writers and actors identify with their subjects. He also hints at a future volume describing his crises.

== Angélique ==
Written in the form of twelve letters addressed to a periodical, Angélique recounts the author's travels through France and Germany in search of an antique book and his discovery of the diary of an historic Fille du Feu. The longest story in the collection, it is more in the style of Les Illuminés.

== Sylvie (Souvenirs du Valois) ==
Much admired by Marcel Proust for its poetic vision, Sylvie is a semi-autobiographical tale of a man who is haunted by the memory of three women in his life, all of whom seem to blend together. The story opens with the narrator at the theatre, where he is enamored by an actress named Aurélie. He is suddenly reminded of a memory from childhood, and he experiences a flashback. First, he remembers a festival where he danced with a local girl named Sylvie but was entranced by Adrienne, a young noble (whose resemblance to Aurélie is what brings on the flashback). Adrienne ultimately becomes a nun.

As Adrienne is unobtainable, he returns to Sylvie several years later and spends many days with her. As they pass by a monastery, the narrator mentions Adrienne, much to Sylvie's dismay. He returns to Paris.

The narrator returns, and Sylvie and he spend a day socializing at an elderly relative's home. However, nothing results from this, and the narrator leaves again.

Finally, Sylvie marries someone else, and the narrator pursues Aurélie, the actress, more aggressively. They become friendly, and the narrator asks her if she ever spent time in a convent, associating her with Adrienne. Ultimately, Aurélie ends her relationship with the narrator, and the narrator returns one final time to Sylvie, now a mother. When he asks about Adrienne, Sylvie reveals that she has been dead many years.

== Chansons et Legendes du Valois ==
A short essay that is appended to Sylvie wherever it is published, it does not constitute a separate section of Les Filles du Feu in itself. The essay describes some folk songs of the province of Valois where Nerval had grown up and where Sylvie is set, and it includes a short folk tale, La Reine des Poissons (The Queen of the Fishes).

== Jemmy ==
A translation, reconstruction and adaptation of a story by Charles Sealsfield, pseudonym of Austrian author Karl Postl (1793–1864), this tale of Jemmy O'Dogherty's adventures among the native Americans. Described by Nerval as "Imité de l'Allemand", an "imitation" rather than a translation of the German original.

== Octavia ==
The story begins in Paris. The narrator, wishing to escape the haunting memory of an "ill-starred love", decides to travel to Italy, stopping first in Marseille for a few days. Every day, when he goes swimming in the bay, he sees a mysterious English woman named Octavia. Blonde, pale, and slender, she is so at home in the water, she could be a mermaid. The narrator's suspicions increase when one day she catches a fish with her bare hands and shows it to him.

The town has been hit by cholera, so the narrator decides to continue his journey by land in order to circumvent the quarantine. As he is waiting in Civitavecchia for the steamboat to arrive, he spots Octavia at the local theater. She is sick, the narrator learns, and her doctors had recommended she travel to Naples to regain her strength. The next day, when he boards the ship headed for Naples, he sees her biting into a lemon rind, and tells her it can't be good for her, considering her chest disease. Surprised, she asks him who told him that she was sick, to which he responds, enigmatically, "The Tiburtine sibyl." He kisses her hand, and she tells him to meet her the next day at Portici.

They disembark and go their separate ways. While she goes to a hotel with her father, the narrator wanders around the city of Naples, eventually attending a ballet where he encounters a marquis he had met in Paris. This aristocrat invites him to an evening party in a salon. Leaving the salon after a pleasant evening, the narrator gets lost in the streets of Naples.

As he is wandering near the Villa Reale, he follows a peasant woman back to her home. The woman's home is so full of religious icons and trinkets, the narrator starts to wonder if she is a witch or a gypsy. She offers him some food and wine, then asks him, "Why so sad?" in Italian, before launching into a peculiar language that strikes him as "primeval," like "Hebrew" or "Syriac." While the narrator is still confused at her language, she pulls out an assortment of accessories which increase her power over him.

Though still under this woman's spell, the narrator successfully tears himself away from her presence. He sets off for the Mount Posilipo. While he is at the top, his thoughts return to the "ill-starred love" he left behind in Paris. Feeling her to be painfully far away, he jumps to his death twice, but each time, miraculously, he survives.

Having recovered his senses, he remembers his appointment with Octavia and goes on his way to Portici. She meets him under a vine arbor, and along with her father, they visit Pompeii and the temple of Isis. When he tells her about the ceremonies that used to take place there, they decide to reenact them. Octavie expresses the wish to play the role of Isis, and the narrator that of Osiris.

As they return to Naples, the narrator doesn't speak of his love for her. She chastises him for being cool and distant, but he says he doesn't feel worthy of her, telling her that he is still haunted by the other woman in Paris. Years later, the author learns that Octavie has married a young painter, who, shortly after their marriage, became paralyzed and bedridden. Even though she dedicates herself to caring for her husband, he is suspicious of her every move. The narrator returns to Marseille, haunted by the knowledge of Octavia's suffering.

== Isis (Souvenirs de Pompei) ==
This travel narrative describes the influence of Egypt's religion on the Roman Empire. Nerval describes a visit he made to Pompeii. The prevailing light in the essay is moonlight, and the Fille du Feu is the goddess Isis. The essay concludes with an examination of some themes common to Christianity and other ancient religions.

== Corilla ==
A short play relating the adventures of two suitors who are after the favors of a theatrical actress. One of them is fobbed off with a flower seller by the official that he pays. The play ends amicably and is a light comedy. The Filles du Feu are the actress and the flower seller.

== Émilie ==
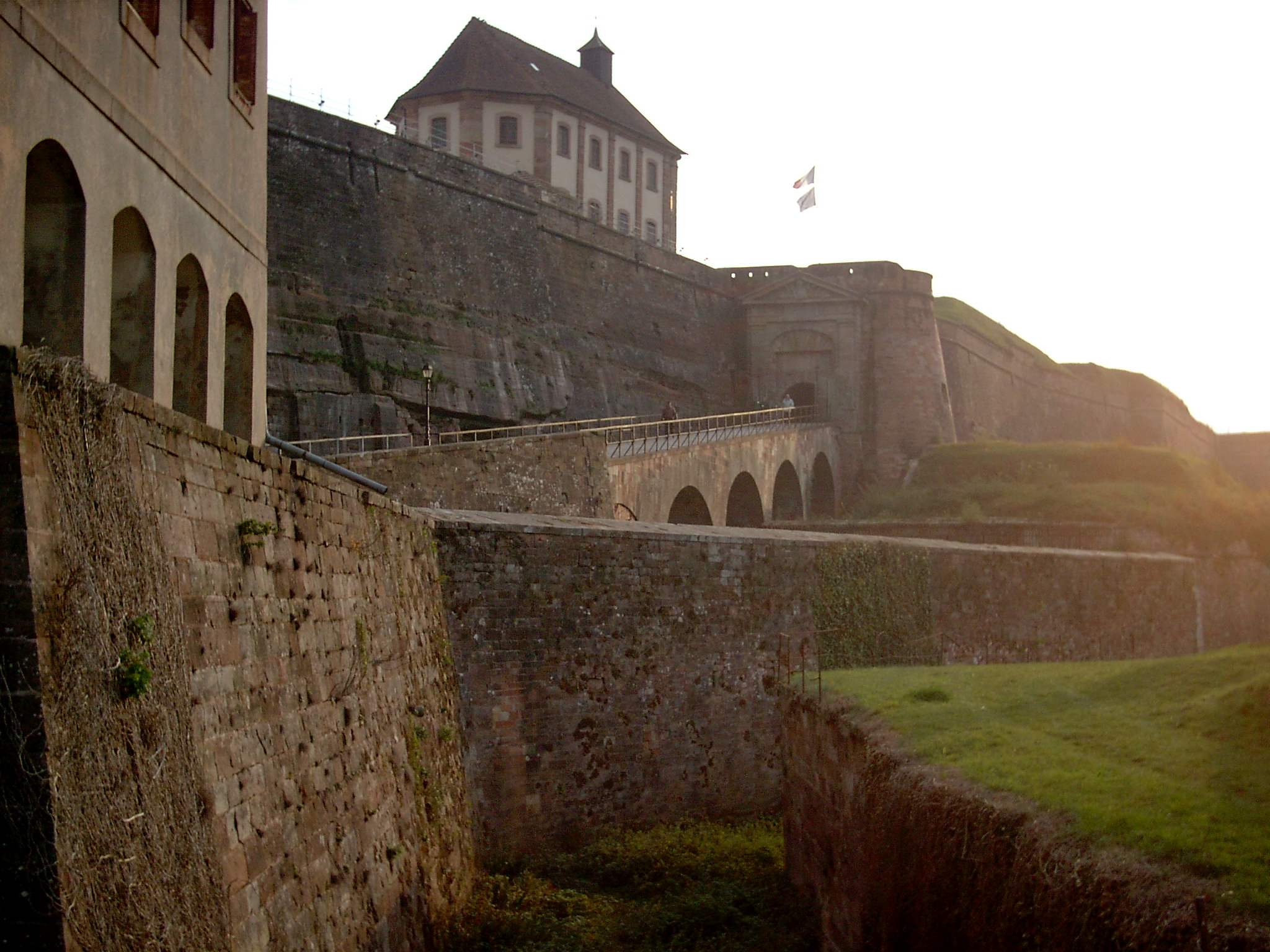
The actual citadel at Bitche where part of Émilie takes place

This story is understood to have been largely the work of Auguste Maquet, a friend of Nerval and of Alexandre Dumas. Maquet left a note in manuscript claiming that he had written it following a plan devised by Nerval, though he himself disliked the ending. It had appeared in the journal Le Messageur in 1839 signed "G." under the title "Le Fort de Bitche".

Émilie is the story of Desroches, a French lieutenant serving near Bitche in Lorraine near the German border sometime after 1815. While recuperating in Metz after being wounded, he befriends Emilie, a young woman from Haguenau in Alsace, and they soon decide to marry. The night before the civil ceremony, Desroches tells some fellow soldiers how he had "killed the first and only man I ever struck in hand-to-hand fighting" during a Prussian attempt on the fort of Bitche. At an inn the next day, Émilie's brother Wilhelm argues with Desroches' comrades about his own father's death at the hands of a French soldier in the same fort in Bitche. The next day, Wilhelm asks Desroches to give him a tour of the fort, and when they reach the spot where Wilhelm's father was killed, Wilhelm accuses Desroches and challenges him to a duel. Émilie sends a priest to intervene, but Desroches, knowing now that he killed her father, realizes that he and Émilie can never be happy together. He re-enlists and is killed on the front line. Émilie retires to a convent.

== The Chimeras ==
The Chimeras (French: Les Chimères), a sequence of twelve sonnets, is appended to Les Filles du Feu. The poems are: "El Desdichado", "Myrtho", "Horus", "Antéros", "Delfica", "Artémis", "Le Christ aux Oliviers (I, II, II, IV, V)" and "Vers Dorés".
