= Władysław Czajkowski =

Ottoman-Polish official

Muzaffer Pasha
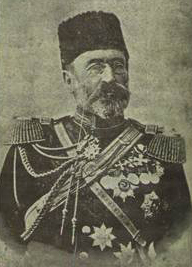
- Born: Władysław Czajkowski; 1837 or 1840
- Died: 1907; Beirut vilayet, Ottoman Empire
- Other name: Ladislas Czaykowski
- Father: Sadyk Pasha
- Military career
- Allegiance: Ottoman Empire
- Rank: Vizier
- Conflict: Russo-Turkish War

Muzaffer Pasha, born as Ladislas Czaykowski or Władysław Czajkowski (1837/40 – 1907, Beirut, Levant), was Mutasarrıf of Mount Lebanon between 1902–1907, a post reserved by international treaty for a Catholic of Ottoman nationality after the civil unrest and international intervention of 1860. He was the son of a Polish count and émigré to the Ottoman Empire, Sadyk Pasha.

Czajkowski was educated in Belgium and France, graduating from the School of Saint-Cyr in 1861. After his arrival in Kostantiniyye, he was aide-de-camp to the Grand vizier Mehmed Fuad Pasha from 1863 to 1866; then to the Sultan Abdülaziz from 1867 to 1870, during which he accompanied the monarch on his European tour. In 1870 he was appointed to the command of a section of cavalry in the military school, and held that office until the outbreak of the Russo-Turkish War, when he went to the front. He served on the staff, then as colonel of a regiment of cossacks. After the end of the war, the Sultan entrusted him with making a plan for reorganization of the army, which he finished in 1885, when he was raised to the rank of general in the Ottoman Army. Before his election as mutessarif in September 1902, Czajkowski had been manager of the Sultan´s horse-breeding stud since 1888.

After accepting the election, he was promoted to Mushir in the Ottoman army, and received the rank of vizier.
