= Voyage to the Orient =

Voyage to the Orient (French: Voyage en Orient) is one of the works of French writer and poet Gérard de Nerval, published during 1851, resulting from his voyage of 1842 to Cairo and Beirut. In addition to a travel account it retells Oriental tales, like Solomon and the Queen of Sheba, in terms of the artist and the act of creation.

The chapters first appeared in the periodical Revue des Deux Mondes in 1846 and 1847, where the series was called Scènes de la Vie Orientale. Later, when the chapters appeared together in book form in 1851, it was retitled Voyage en Orient, and an account of de Nerval's travels through Europe before leaving for the Orient was added. For a later edition, de Nerval added a series of appendices, the majority of the material taken directly from Lane's Manners and Customs of the Modern Egyptians. In 1930, the book was translated as The Women of Cairo by Conrad Elphinstone in two volumes, it included only the material originally published in 1846–47. More recent translations are incomplete.
