= Nasrallah Coussa =

Ottoman governor of Mount Lebanon from 1868 to 1873

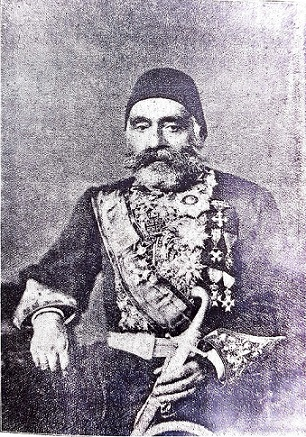
Franko Pasha

Nasrallah Coussa (known as Nasri Franco Pasha, Franko Pascha, Nasrallah Franco Pasha, Arabic: فرنكو باشا) was the mutasarrif of the Mount Lebanon Mutasarrifate from 1868 until his death in 1873. He was a Melkite Greek Catholic from Aleppo in Syria.
