= Yusuf al-Asir =

Islamic figure from the Ottoman era

- يُوسُف الأسير
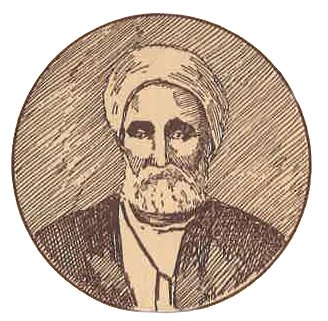

Personal life
- Born: 1232 AH = 1817 AD Sidon, Sidon Eyalet, Ottoman Empire
- Died: 6 Rabiul Awwal 1307 AH = November 28, 1889 AD (71–72 years old) Beirut, Beirut vilayet, Ottoman Empire
- Resting place: Beirut, Lebanon
- Spouse: Hanifa bint Muhammad Al-Naqib, Amna Sharitah
- Children: Six boys and three girls
- Parents: Abdul Qader bin Muhammad al-Asir (father); Nafisa Al-Naqib (mother)
- Citizenship: Lebanon

Religious life
- Religion: Sunni Islam
- Jurisprudence: Shafi'i school, Hanafi school
- Profession: Poet, Faqīh, Qadi, journalist, teacher, and writer

Al-Sheikh Al-Allama Abu Muhammad Yusuf ibn Abd al-Qadir ibn Muhammad al-Husseini al-Asir al-Saydaoui al-Azhari al-Shafi'i was a faqih, scholar of Islamic inheritance law, writer, poet, linguist, and journalist during the Arab Nahda of the late Ottoman period. He was born in the city of Sidon, which was part of the Sidon Eyalet, in 1232 AH (1817 CE), according to the historian Al-Zirikli, although Kahhala and Jurji Zaydan have placed his birth year at 1230 AH (1815 CE).

Yusuf grew up in Sidon under the care of his father, where he began his education by memorizing the Quran at the age of seven. He later attended the Muradiyya school in Damascus before returning to Sidon. He then moved to Cairo, where he spent seven years studying and teaching at Al-Azhar University. While in Cairo, he interacted with several notable scholars and dignitaries.

Upon his return to Greater Syria, he devoted himself to teaching, writing, and serving as a judge and mufti, moving between Sidon, Tripoli, and Beirut. Among his notable students were figures who later held prominent positions, including Youhanna al-Hajj, who became the Maronite Patriarch; Bishop Youhanna Habib, the founder of the Congregation of the Maronite Lebanese Missionaries; and the American Orientalist Dr. Cornelius Van Alen Van Dyck, among others.

Upon his return to Beirut, Al-Asir devoted himself to writing, focusing mainly on Islamic Law and language. He wrote a book on Islamic law entitled "Ra'id al-Fara'id" and a commentary on "Atwaq al-Dhahab fi al-Mawa'iz" by the renowned scholar Al-Zamakhshari. He also composed many poems, many of which were published in a collection known by his name. In addition, he published several scholarly articles in newspapers and served for a time as editor-in-chief of the newspapers "Thamarat al-Funun" and "Lisan al-Hal". One of his notable contributions during this period was assisting Dr. Cornelius Van Dyck and Sheikh Nasif al-Yaziji in the Arabic translation of the Holy Bible. He also composed Christian spiritual hymns widely sung in churches and homes by Evangelical Christians.

Al-Asir died in Beirut on 6 Rabi' al-Awwal 1307 AH, corresponding to November 28, 1889. He was interred in the Bashoura Cemetery. His passing was lamented by scholars, writers, and poets, with approximately twenty eulogies dedicated to him. His elegies were compiled by Sheikh Ibrahim al-Ahdab and Abu al-Hasan al-Kusti in a booklet published in the year of his death, which included a biography of Al-Asir.

== Origin and pedigree ==
Al-Asir traced his lineage back to the family of the Islamic prophet Muhammad, specifically descending from Husayn ibn Ali ibn Abi Talib. Consequently, his family is referred to as "Al-Asir al-Husayni." As asserted by the Beirut-based historian Dr. Hassan Hallak, the Asir family's roots can be traced back to Arab tribes, particularly the Banu Judham tribe. This tribe played a pivotal role in the conquests of Greater Syria, Egypt, and the Morocco during the era of Caliph Umar ibn al-Khattab. They were led by the companion Amr ibn al-As. In her master's thesis, Lebanese researcher Mona Othman Hijazi provided a comprehensive account of Al-Asir's lineage, citing the family tree preserved by his great-grandson Ahmad ibn Humaid ibn Ahmad ibn Yusuf. According to this record, Al-Asir's lineage can be traced as follows:

"Yusuf ibn Abd al-Qadir ibn Muhammad ibn Mustafa ibn Abdullah ibn Uthman ibn Ali ibn Saif al-Millah al-Sayyid al-Salar al-Sinjari ibn Qutb al-Din ibn Ali ibn al-Husayn ibn Mas'ud ibn Mahmoud ibn Khalil ibn Ibrahim ibn Muhammad Abbas ibn Halim ibn Rukn al-Din ibn Ghanim ibn al-Sayyid Zaki al-Din Salem, the brother of Sayyid Muhammad Abi al-Wafa. His lineage connects to the Al-Wafa'iyyah through Sayyid Zaki al-Din Salem, son of Muhammad ibn Zain ibn Hasan ibn Zaid ibn Imam Ali Zayn al-Abidin ibn Imam al-Husayn ibn Amir al-Mu'minin Ali ibn Abi Talib."

He was given the sobriquet "al-Azhari" due to his proximity to al-Azhar and his acquisition of intellectual and traditional sciences from its scholars. It is a widely held view that the family of al-Asir acquired this title as a result of one of their ancestors being captured by the Franks on the island of Malta.

He became known as "al-Asir" throughout his captivity, and this title persisted even after he was released and returned to Sidon, eventually becoming his primary designation, superseding his original family name, "Sinjar." It is postulated that the forebears of this family migrated from Maghreb to Levant. While their vessel was navigating in the vicinity of the island of Malta, they were apprehended by pirates operating under the Hospitaller flag. After a period of captivity, they set sail once more for the Levantine coast, ultimately settling in Sidon, where they have been known as the al-Asir family ever since. The reason for their ancestor's presence on a ship navigating the Mediterranean near Malta is unknown, including whether he was a passenger, a soldier, a trader, or an emigrant. Additionally, the exact date of his capture or release is not known. The earliest documents and legal records mentioning the al-Asir family in Sidon date back to the early 18th century.

In his book Sharh Rā'id al-Farā'id, Shaykh Yusuf explains his name, title, and the rationale behind his nickname "al-Azhari." His father was Abd al-Qadir ibn Muhammad al-Asir, a merchant from Sidon who engaged in the trade of grains and wheat from his warehouse situated near the Mosque of the Sea, adjacent to the city's port. He was renowned for his piety, frequently devoting himself to worship or attending lectures in the mosque after the completion of his daily tasks. His mother was Nafisa al-Naqeeb. Al-Asir had two brothers, Muhammad and Mahmoud, and a sister named Katiba.

== Life ==
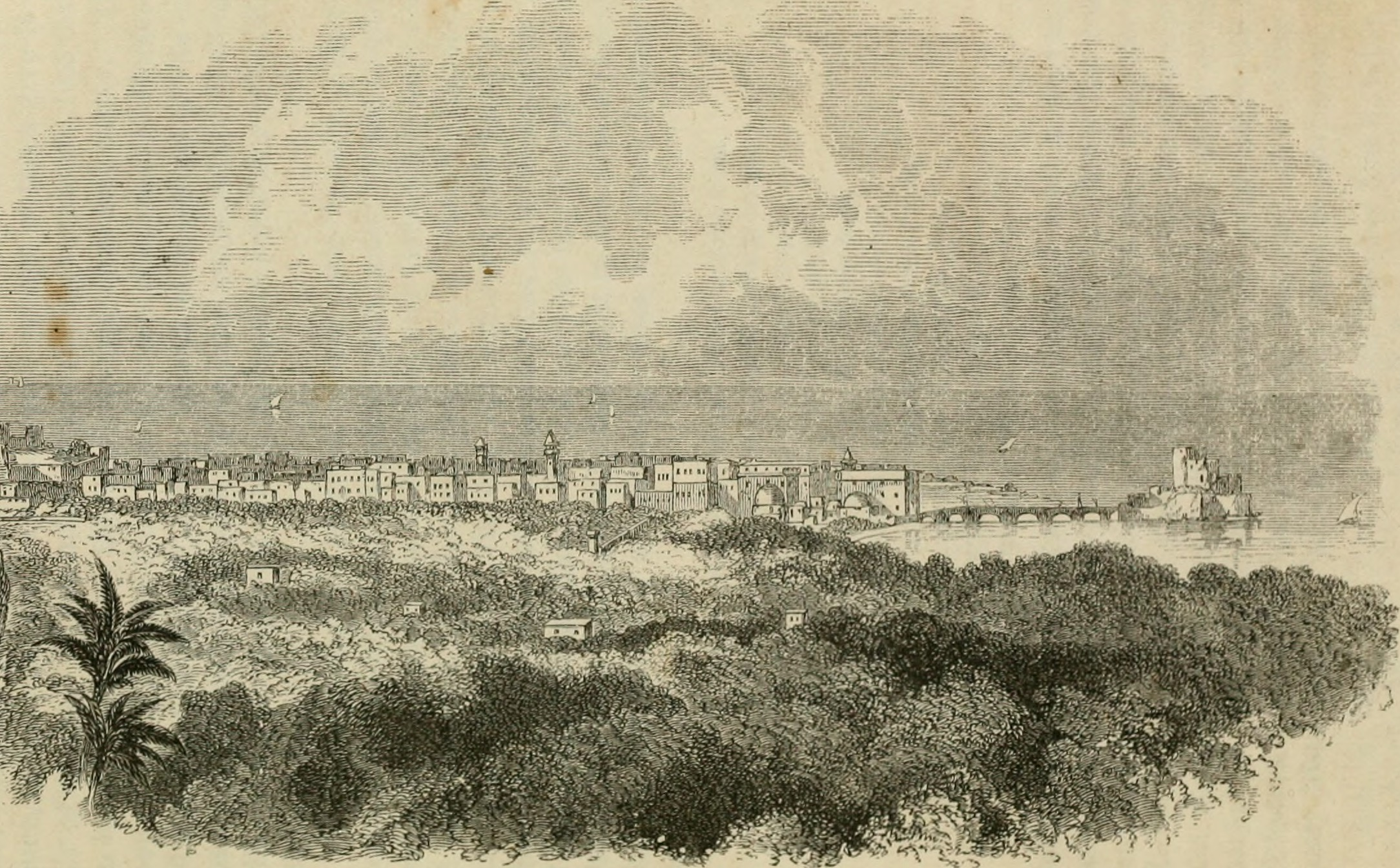
Saida, Al-Asir's hometown, as it appeared in 1864.

=== Birth and upbringing ===
Yusuf al-Asir was born in Sidon in 1232 AH (1817 CE), according to some sources, and in 1230 AH (1815 CE), according to other sources. At the age of six, his father sent him to the Kuttab of Shaykh Ibrahim al-Arifi to commence his initial education. Al-Asir spent three years at the aforementioned educational establishment, during which he acquired the fundamentals of reading and writing. He demonstrated remarkable memory capabilities and achieved proficiency in memorizing the Quran by the age of seven. During this period, he studied under three renowned scholars: he learned the Quran from Shaykh Ibrahim al-Arifi, the rules of Tajwid from Shaykh Ali al-Dairbi, and the fundamentals of Arabic from Shaykh Muhammad al-Sharnbali.

As he matured, al-Asir engaged in commercial activities with his father, yet he remained keen on pursuing knowledge and the company of scholars. Given the dearth of suitable opportunities in Sidon at the time, he resolved to embark on a journey to neighboring regions to further his studies.

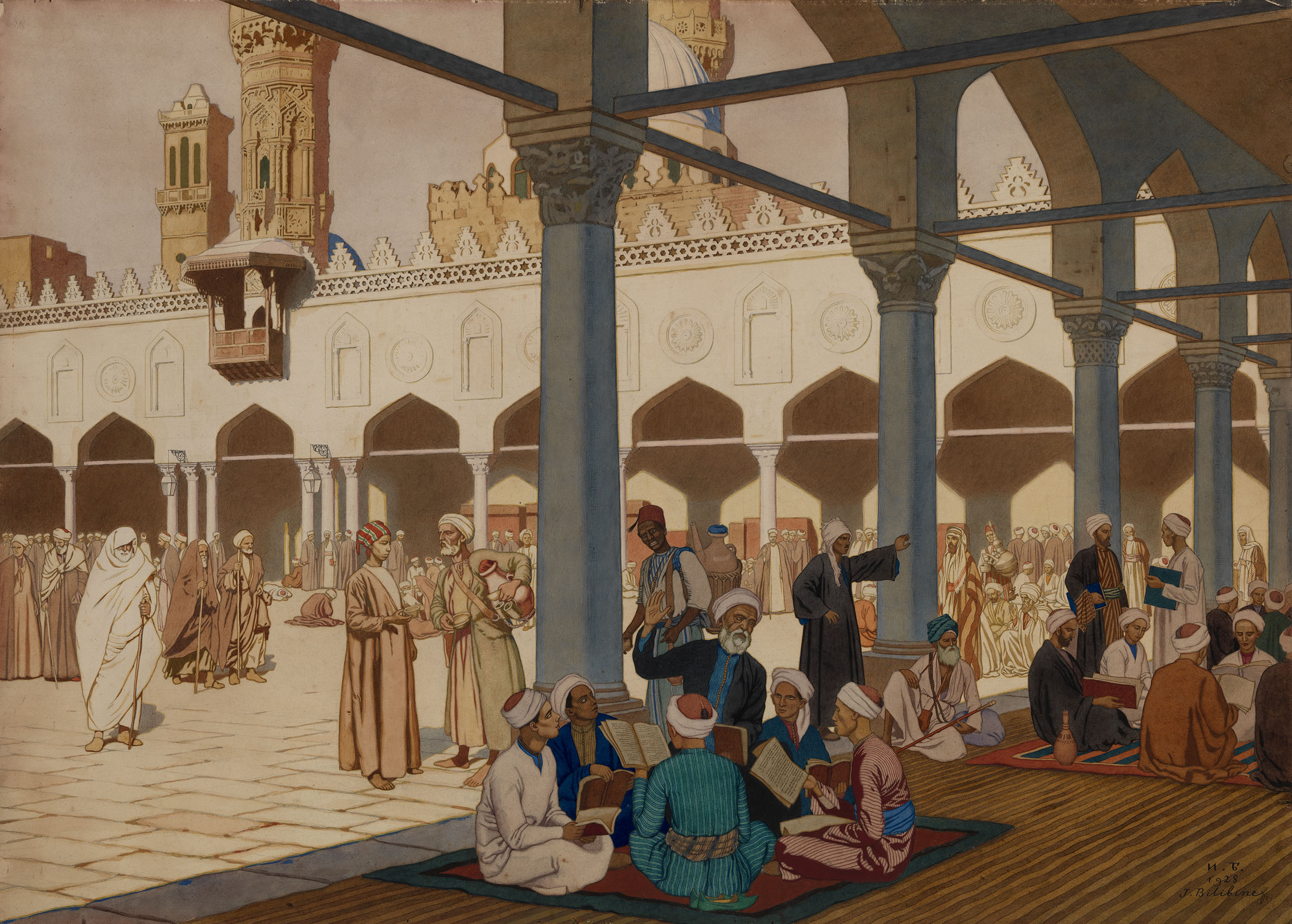
Part of the Al-Azhar seminars where Al-Asir studied.

=== Peregrinations to Damascus and Egypt in pursuit of erudition. ===
At the age of seventeen (1247 AH = 1832 CE), al-Asir embarked on a journey to Damascus, where he resided at the Muradiyya School. During this period, he received instruction from the institution's esteemed scholars. Nevertheless, his tenure was relatively brief, lasting no more than a year, according to some sources, or perhaps as little as six months, as he received word of his father's death. He subsequently returned to Sidon to assume responsibility for the management of his mother's and siblings' affairs. Al-Asir assumed control of his father's business and gained a reputation for integrity and devotion, which contributed to the prosperity of his enterprise and a growing customer base. Once his siblings had reached adulthood and established their livelihoods, al-Asir resolved to resume his travels in pursuit of knowledge. In 1834 CE, he relocated to Cairo and took up residence at al-Azhar, a renowned center of learning for students from various parts of the Islamic world.

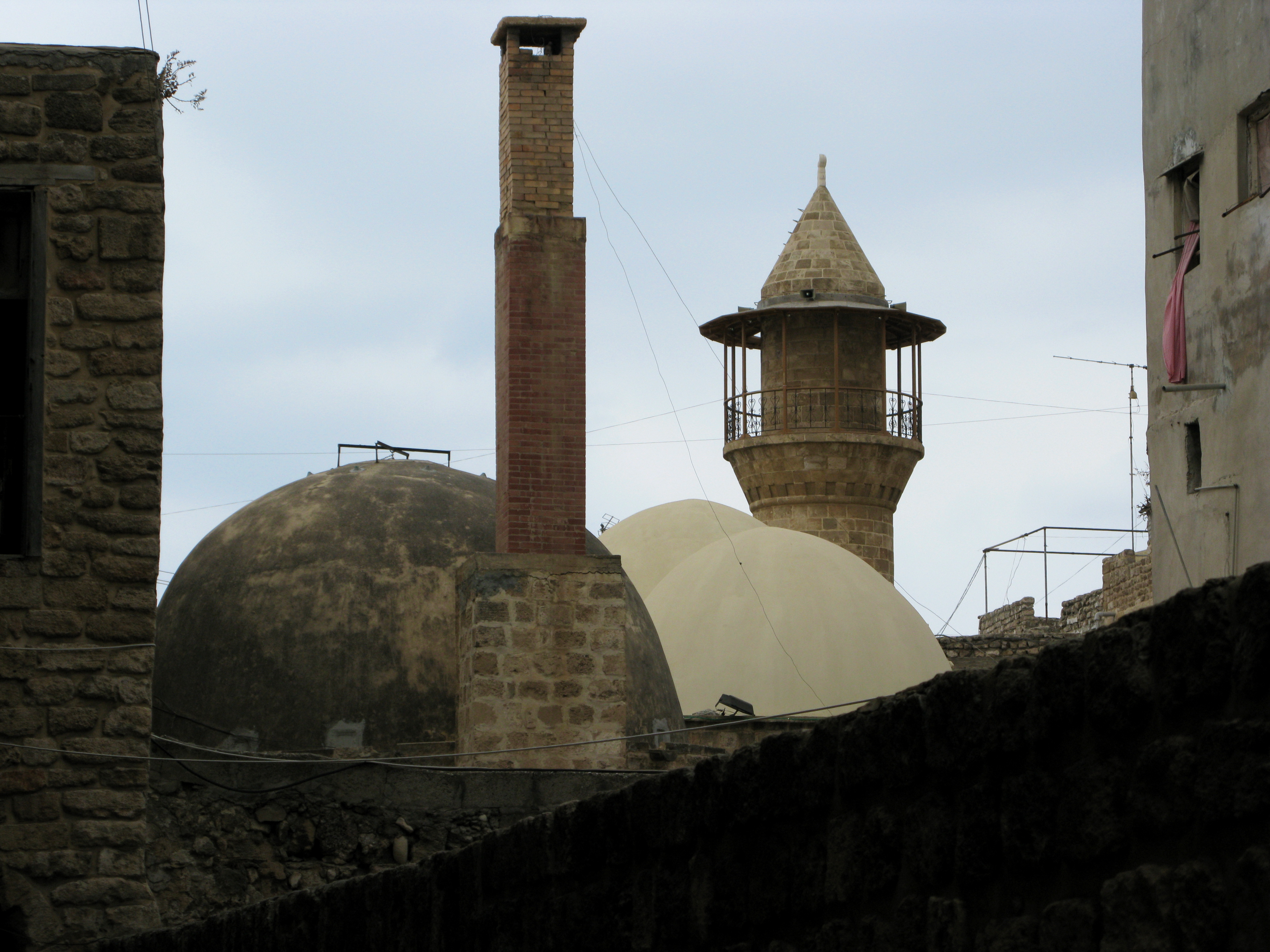
Kikhia Mosque in Sidon, where Al-Asir taught for a period of time.

Al-Asir remained at al-Azhar for seven years, during which time he studied under the guidance of the institution's most esteemed scholars. He demonstrated remarkable proficiency in both intellectual and traditional sciences, becoming a highly regarded imam and attaining a prominent position among his peers and teachers. Al-Asir proceeded from one lecture circle to another and from one scholar to another, committing to memory a multitude of religious and jurisprudential commentaries and interpretations. His instructors at al-Azhar included Muhammad al-Shibini, Muhammad al-Damnhouri, Ibrahim al-Bajuri, Ahmad al-Dumyati, Muhammad al-Tantawi, and other distinguished scholars and jurists of al-Azhar.

Al-Asir was awarded the global ijazah from al-Azhar and subsequently promoted to the rank of senior teacher. He established his study circle, which was attended by prominent scholars and learned men. He frequently participated in the public examinations held in the presence of the Egyptian governor, Muhammad Ali basha, at the schools, often proposing many of the questions to the students with the guidance of his teachers. Al-Asir remained in Egypt until 1841 when he decided to return to Sidon due to a Liver disease, as the Egyptian climate was not conducive to his recovery.

=== Return to Sidon ===
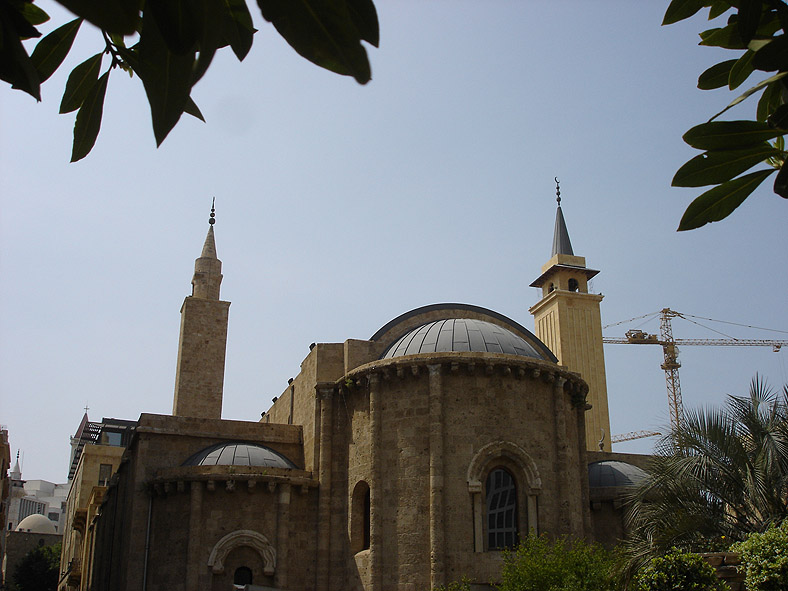
Al-Omari Grand Mosque (2010 AD), where the prisoner used to give his lessons.

Upon returning to his hometown, al-Asir commenced delivering lectures to students at the Kheikhia Mosque. However, after a few months, he discerned that his lectures did not resonate with his local audience and that there was no viable avenue for disseminating his knowledge in his town. Consequently, he resolved to abandon this endeavor.

It is reported that al-Asir was delivering a series of daily lectures on preaching and guidance at the aforementioned mosque. Subsequently, he observed a gradual decline in the number of attendees, which ultimately resulted in a near-total cessation of attendance. Upon inquiring about the reason for this decline in attendance, al-Asir was informed by the mosque's caretaker that those who had previously attended his lectures had relocated to the Qutaysh Mosque to listen to another scholar's lectures. Al-Asir and the caretaker proceeded to the aforementioned mosque to ascertain the reasons behind the shift in attendance. Upon arrival, al-Asir approached the window and listened to the sermon, which centered on the discussion of chickens, their breeds, and their benefits. Al-Asir was disheartened and disillusioned by this experience and promptly returned home, requesting that his wife prepare their belongings. He stated, "Madina Ka Hazehe La Yotlab Ala'elm Feha""In a city like this, it is challenging to pursue knowledge."

=== Leaving Sidon for Tarabulus in the Levant, then Beirut and Mount Lebanon ===
In 1841, Al-Asir departed from his hometown of Sidon and proceeded to Tripoli, where he resided for three years. He was greeted with great enthusiasm by the inhabitants of Tripoli, who regarded him as an eminent scholar despite his relatively young age. It was reported that he never ate a single meal at home, as he was hosted daily by different Tripolitanian households. In Tripoli, al-Asir became the head of the scribes at the city's Sharia court, and many of its prominent scholars and intellectuals studied under him. Among his notable students was Yohanna al-Hajj, a Maronite priest who later became the Patriarch of the Maronites in 1890.

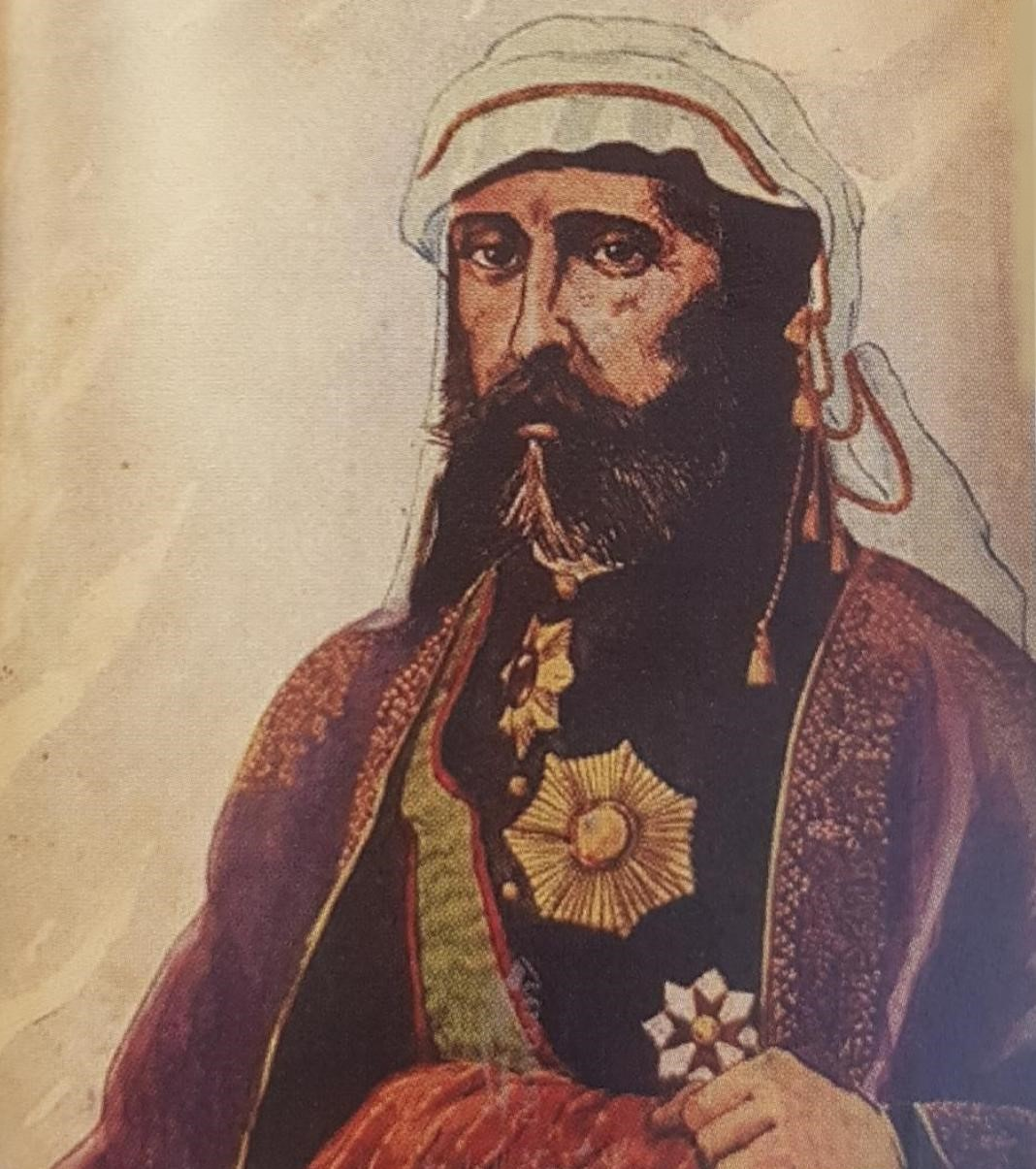
Daoud Pasha, the first governor of Mount Lebanon and the creator of the position of prosecutor general in the Ottoman Empire. He used the prisoner from 1861 to 1868.

The climate of Tripoli proved to be less conducive to al-Asir's health than he had hoped, prompting his relocation to Beirut, where he believed the air to be more beneficial. His reputation preceded him, and a considerable number of students sought his guidance. At that time, Beirut was experiencing a notable cultural renaissance, with several prominent educational and academic institutions emerging. This attracted the attention of Levantines in general and scholars in particular, including American missionaries. They connected with al-Asir, and some studied under him to learn the Arabic language. He also assisted them in refining the Arabic translation of the Holy Bible and helped compose many of the hymns used in Evangelical churches.

During his inaugural visit to Beirut, al-Asir conducted his classes at the Al-Omari Grand Mosque. Subsequently, he was appointed as the head of the scribes at the city's Sharia court, during the tenure of its Qadi, Mustafa Ashir Efendi. Subsequently, he assumed the role of the judge in the town of Bikfaya in the Matn District, which constituted the center of the Christian Qa'im Maqamiyya (sub-governorate) in Mount Lebanon during the tenure of its governor, Emir Bashir Ahmad Qaidbey al-Lam'i. Subsequently, he relocated to Acre, where he served as the city's mufti for approximately one year. His seal bore an inscription derived from a verse in the Quran. "O Yusuf (Joseph), the man of truth! Explain to us".

In 1861, al-Asir was summoned to Baabda, the seat of the Mount Lebanon Mutasarrifate, by its governor, Dawud Pasha. He was appointed as the public prosecutor for the mountain due to his extensive knowledge, perceptiveness, and esteemed standing among his peers. Al-Asir held this position for seven years until his resignation in 1868. He was the inaugural public prosecutor in the Ottoman Empire, as this role was not previously established until Dawud Pasha instituted it in Mount Lebanon. The Ottoman state subsequently introduced the position during the First Constitutional Era in 1876. Shaykh Yusuf's remuneration at the time was fifty Ottoman liras per month.

=== Trip to and work in Istanbul ===
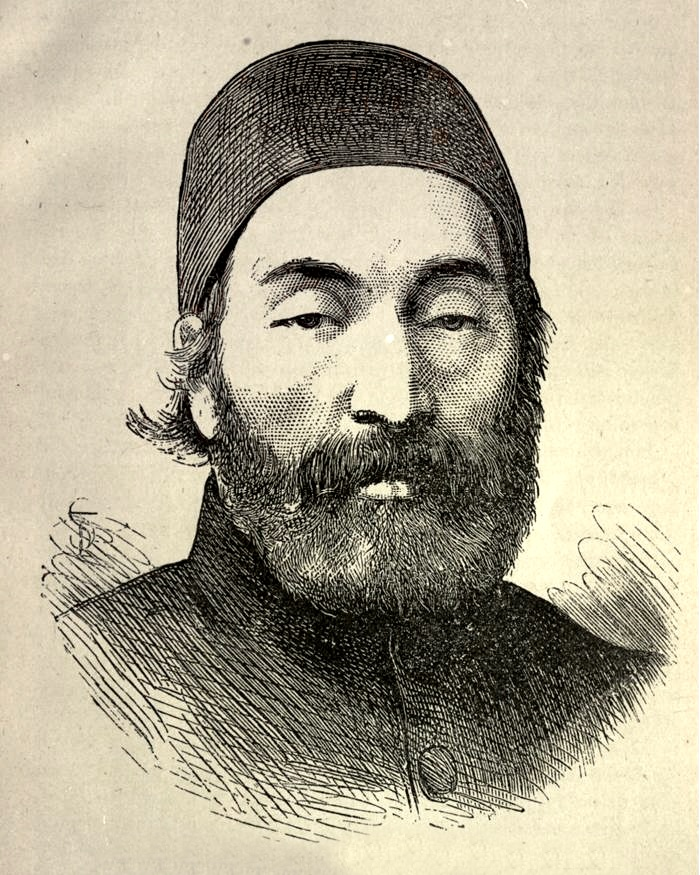
A portrait of Safwat Pasha, a prominent Ottoman politician who was a follower of al-Asir's lessons.

The reasons for Al-Asir's relocation to Istanbul, the capital of the Ottoman Empire, in 1868 have been the subject of considerable debate. One account posits that Ottoman politicians and decision-makers deemed it necessary to maintain his supervision while capitalizing on his expertise. This account posits that al-Asir, along with other prominent intellectuals and scholars, endorsed the notion of incorporating Beirut, Sidon, and Tripoli into the Mutasarrifia of Mount Lebanon. Following the issuance of the Règlement Organique, which granted Mount Lebanon internal autonomy and defined its governance, the region's economic and administrative conditions stabilized. In contrast, the three cities remained afflicted by chaos and backwardness. Al-Asir and his contemporaries thus sought to extend the benefits of the Mutasarrifate's privileges to these cities. However, the governor of Syria, Mehmed Rashid Pasha, expressed reservations about this proposal and reported Shaykh Yusuf to the Sublime Porte. Ottoman officials shared Rashid Pasha's concerns and summoned al-Asir to the imperial capital.

Another source posits that Dawud Pasha, the Mutasarrif of Mount Lebanon, aspired to retain his role as governor of the region indefinitely. He sought to exert pressure on the Ottoman Empire by demanding the reinforcement of the autonomy of the territories under his control and the extension of his authority to encompass Tripoli, Beirut, Sidon, Wadi al-Taym, and the Beqaa Valley of Azizi and Baalbek. He encouraged a group of residents of Sidon to draft a petition in support of these demands. In response, the authorities thwarted his plan by summoning select signatories to Istanbul, including Shaykh Yusuf al-Asir, who arrived in 1868.

When Dawud Pasha persisted, the foreign minister, Mehmed Fuad Pasha, provided misleading counsel, suggesting that if he wanted his demands met, he should threaten to resign from the Mutasarrifate, thereby forcing the government to comply. Dawud Pasha was ultimately unsuccessful in his efforts, submitting his demands alongside his resignation but having them promptly rejected by the Ottoman government, which accepted his resignation.

Upon al-Asir's arrival in Istanbul, students of knowledge promptly gathered around him, and he began holding study circles attended by prominent dignitaries, ministers, scholars, and some members of the Ottoman family. Among his notable attendees and admirers was Saffet Pasha, the minister of the interior. Al-Asir held several positions in Istanbul, including membership in the State Council and the presidency of the Bureau of Revision in the Ministry of Education. He was also appointed as an Arabic language professor at the Imperial School of Teachers, where he gained a distinguished reputation among the elite of the Ottoman capital during his tenure.

=== Leaving Istanbul for Beirut ===
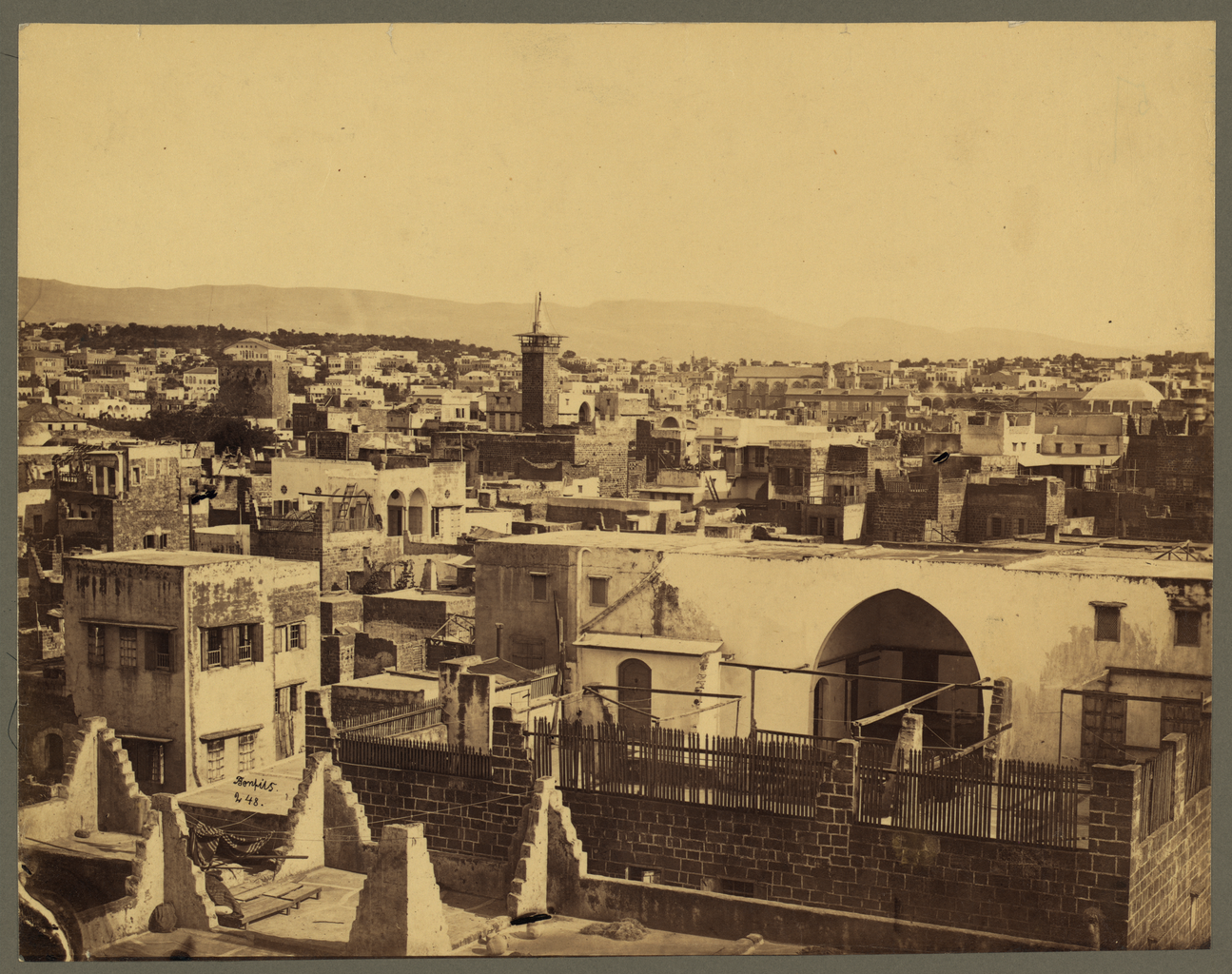
Part of the city of Beirut after 1867, during the period when al-Assir settled there after his return from Istanbul.

The inclement weather in Istanbul had a deleterious effect on al-Asir's already fragile health, prompting him to resolve to return to Beirut. Upon learning of al-Asir's intention to resign from his post, the minister of education expressed regret at the loss of his expertise and delayed accepting his resignation, hoping to retain his services in the Ottoman capital due to the popularity of the books he had edited. The minister proffered al-Asir a distinguished position with a substantial remuneration package and the pledge of prospective advancement. His colleagues and supporters, including ministers and prominent figures, also attempted to dissuade him from his decision to depart Istanbul and return to Beirut. However, al-Asir remained unwavering in his resolve to leave Istanbul and ultimately prevailed. In a letter written by al-Asir to his son Muhammad upon his arrival in the Ottoman capital, it is revealed that his initial intention had been to remain in Istanbul, had it not been for the deterioration of his health. In the aforementioned letter, he states:"Al Hamdulellah Alze Naqlna Mn Dar Elzol W El Hawan Ela Dar Al Sa'ada W Al Aman" "Praise be to God, who has transported us from the land of humiliation and disgrace to the land of happiness and security," indicating his initial contentment with his relocation to Istanbul before his health compelled him to reconsider.

In his book Nafhat al-Basham fi Rihlat al-Sham, the scholar Muhammad Abdul Jawad al-Qayyati offers an additional rationale for al-Asir's return to Beirut, namely, his sense of loneliness and estrangement from his homeland and family. Despite his elevated status and prominent roles in Istanbul, he experienced a sense of isolation. As al-Qayyati observes, "he found a lack of individuals with whom he could engage in literary discourse or converse in Arabic." This feeling of estrangement contributed to his desire to depart from the city and return to his cultural roots.

Upon his return to Beirut, al-Asir resumed his research and authorship in the intellectual, linguistic, and jurisprudential sciences, as well as Islamic inheritance laws (fara'id). He held teaching positions at Al-Hikma School and other academic institutions, where he mentored numerous students in the field of jurisprudence. This period was the most prolific and active of al-Asir's life, as all of his published and manuscript works, along with his research and articles, were created during this time, except those published in Istanbul newspapers during his stay there.

Notable among the newspapers in which al-Asir's writings appeared were Lisan al-Hal and Thamarat al-Funun, for which he served as editor-in-chief for a period. Additionally, he was appointed as an assistant judge in Beirut.

== Death and grave ==
Sheikh Yusuf al-Asir died in Beirut on the evening of Friday, 6 Rabi' al-Awwal 1307 AH (November 28, 1889 CE). His passing was met with profound sorrow by the people of Beirut and the broader Levant, as numerous individuals had pursued their studies under his guidance and were keenly aware of his esteemed standing and contributions. The following morning, al-Asir was interred following a Funeral prayer at the Grand Omari Mosque. The funeral procession was led by primary school students, municipal guards, police officers, gendarmes, and a contingent of soldiers on foot and horseback. Subsequently, Quranic reciters and Sufi sheikhs, bearing their respective banners, followed the procession, which was then concluded by crowds of the deceased's family, friends, and admirers. The procession also included the governor of Beirut, the city's Mufti, and notable figures from various communities, who accompanied the coffin to its final resting place in the Bashoura cemetery. An epitaph was inscribed on the grave by Sheikh Abu al-Hassan al-Kusti, a friend of the deceased, marking the dates of his birth and death.

The passing of Sheikh Yusuf al-Asir deeply affected his students and associates, prompting many of them to compose poems and write articles in his honor, celebrating his contributions to the dissemination of knowledge and culture and documenting his achievements and legacy. His friend, Sheikh Ibrahim al-Ahdab, compiled much of what was written in a book entitled "Mourning the Sheikh Yusuf al-Asir," which spans forty-one pages. In the book's introduction, al-Ahdab stated:

"...Afterwards, the scholarly community was struck by a great calamity... as the major disaster befell with the loss of the scholar and sage, Sheikh Yusuf al-Asir. The gardens of knowledge lament him in their essence, and his works travel across the world, marking the realms of knowledge with the brilliance that flowed from him."

The outpouring of grief for Sheikh Yusuf al-Asir extended beyond the ranks of Beirut's scholarly and literary elite. Among those who expressed their grief were Sheikh Ali Abu al-Mawahir al-Dajjani, the Mufti of Jaffa; Mahmoud al-Hajj Hassan Abdullah, the poet from Kheima and Marjeyoun; and Al-Sayyed Mohsen al-Amin Additionally, notable Beiruti figures who mourned him included Sheikh Mustafa Naja and Sheikh Abdul Rahman Salam. Among the other notable figures who expressed their grief were Amin al-'Amili; Sheikh Said Hamdan, the Appeals Judge in Mount Lebanon; the poet Raghib Azzedin; Sheikh Muhyi al-Din al-Khayyat; Prince Nasib Arslan; and the poet Raghib al-Buzuri.

== Character ==
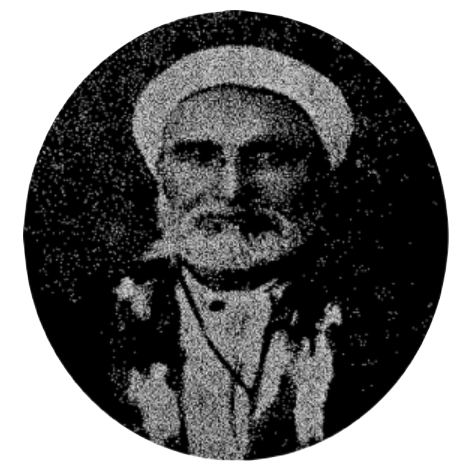
A photograph of Sheikh Yusuf al-Assir, one of the few surviving photographs in which he appears.

Sheikh Yusuf al-Asir was described as having an average height, a medium build, a dark complexion, black hair, and a thick beard. In his account, Egyptian traveler Abdul Rahman Bey Sami characterizes him as "humble and sociable," noting that "some said he never denied anyone who sought knowledge from him during his lifetime; he always responded to those who asked him, never sending anyone away empty-handed." He was known for his light-heartedness and quick wit, as described by the writer Maroun Aboud, who remarks, "Our sheikh was light-spirited, and his gatherings were charming and pleasant."

In his writings, Joseph Elian Sarkis characterizes him as exhibiting "a great deal of gentleness, serenity, and good manners, with a detachment from worldly matters." Father Louis Cheikho observed that he was "pure of heart, eloquent in speech, and proficient in both prose and poetry." Sheikh Muhammad Abd al-Jawad al-Qayyati, who encountered him during his tenure in the Levant, referred to him as "the eminent professor, the brilliant scholar, and the renowned authority in research and writing."

Yusuf Asad Dagher characterized him as "intelligent, with a discerning critical perspective, and dependable in the domains of Arabic sciences and jurisprudence." Jurji Zaydan observed that al-Asir was "truthful in his promises, with a strong memory; when asked about any topic, he would provide a clear and concise answer, employing straightforward expressions to facilitate comprehension." Additionally, Zeidan observed that al-Asir exhibited a noteworthy degree of gentleness, composure, and benevolence, an affinity for knowledge, and a propensity to support scholars. He exemplified the veneration for learning and the aspiration to disseminate it for the public good that was characteristic of the ancients. Viscount Philippe de Tarrazi attested that he "passed away on November 28, 1889 / 6 Rabi' al-Awwal 1307 AH," and was lauded in all languages for his benevolent character, his asceticism in worldly matters, and his dedication to disseminating knowledge.

Regarding his piety and asceticism, Zeidan observed that the individual in question was devoted to his faith, detached from worldly affairs, and steadfast in fulfilling religious obligations. He did not hesitate to attend to the necessities of his household, and he had a profound passion for reciting or listening to the Quran daily. He would often remark, "If we had discovered this Quran in the wilderness, we would have been certain that it was a divine revelation." His generosity was so immense that his children would describe him as "having pockets full of holes."

== Scientific Activities ==
=== Teaching and Journalism ===
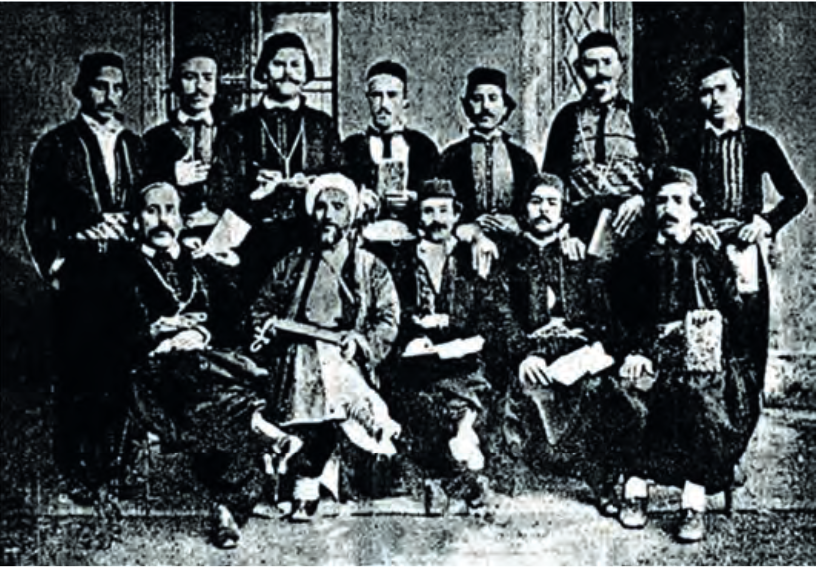
Teacher Boutros al-Bustani with Sheikh Youssef al-Asir (far left, seated) at the National School.

Al-Asir commenced his teaching career at Al-Azhar following the insistence of his professors and mentors, who recognized his aptitude during his own studies and encouraged him to conduct scholarly sessions. Upon accepting the position, a group of students assembled to hear his lectures and engage in discussions about his views. Subsequently, upon obtaining his global teaching license and advancing to the rank of senior instructor, his sessions began to attract prominent scholars and senior religious figures. Upon returning to the Levant, he taught at the Kaykhiyya Mosque in Sidon, the Great Umari Mosque in Beirut, and at the Teachers' College in Istanbul, as previously mentioned.

Upon his return from Istanbul and subsequent settlement in Beirut, al-Asir became a highly sought-after figure among the modern schools established by Western missionaries or local communities, who competed to include him in their teaching faculties. He taught Islamic jurisprudence at Al-Hikma School, which had a law institute established under a special decree from Istanbul. At that time, instruction in Islamic jurisprudence was only available in the Ottoman capital or at Al-Azhar. The law institute at Al-Hikma attracted students from various Ottoman provinces, as well as from the Qajar Kingdom of Iran, who sought to study Islamic sciences and the Arabic Language. Additionally, al-Asir taught at the American School in Aabey, the Syrian Protestant College, and Thalath Aqmar School of the Greek Orthodox Church. His curriculum included subjects such as Fiqh, legislative sciences, grammar, morphology, rhetoric, and stylistic arts. He also held the position of a professor of morphology at the National School, which was founded by Butrus al-Bustani in the Zuqaq al-Blat district.

In addition to utilizing lecture halls as a means of disseminating his knowledge and ideas, al-Asir also employed newspapers as a platform for the same purpose. This was of particular significance given the increasing number and importance of newspapers from the latter half of the nineteenth century. They became an effective means of spreading reformist ideas, disseminating modernist opinions, and addressing societal issues. Al-Asir's initial foray into journalism was with the Istanbul-based newspaper Al-Jawa'ib, published during his tenure there in 1861. His approach to writing articles involved posing questions to an unidentified individual under a pseudonym and addressing them to the editor. He then proceeded to answer the questions in the form of his own views on the subject, signing his responses with a different pseudonym.

In 1875, the newspaper Thamarat al-Funun was inaugurated, with Sheikh Abdul Qadir al-Qabbani assuming the role of editor-in-chief. The newspaper rapidly attained a prominent position in Beirut and across the Levant, becoming the inaugural publication to represent the Muslim voice in Beirut as a counterpart to the Catholic newspaper Al-Bashir. The articles were authored by an elite group of prominent writers and intellectuals, with al-Asir among the most prolific contributors. The list of notable figures who contributed to the publication includes Sheikh Abdul Qadir al-Qabbani himself, Sheikh Ahmad bin Hasan Tabbara, Sheikh Ibrahim al-Ahdab, Adib Ishaq, Salim bin Abbas al-Shallouf, Ismail Dhuhni Bek, the accountant of the Mutasarrifate of Mount Lebanon, and others. Al-Asir contributed articles to Thamarat al-Funun for an extended period, frequently advocating for obedience to the Ottoman Sultan, the commander of the Faithful. This was based on the premise that such loyalty was rooted in religious duty. He advocated for the Ottoman Empire as Amir al-Mu'minin. Both Vicomte Philippe de Tarazi and the scholar Al-Zarkali have noted that al-Asir served as the editor-in-chief of Thamarat al-Funun for a period of time, though some sources suggest that he only contributed specific articles.

Additionally, Sheikh Yusuf contributed to Lisan al-Hal, a prominent newspaper in Beirut during that period. In recognition of his contributions to the fields of teaching, journalism, and legislation, as well as his approach to reforming the Ottoman state from within the system rather than through revolution, the Ottoman Empire granted him a stipend of five hundred qersh, as announced in Thamarat al-Funun.

=== Language and Poetry ===
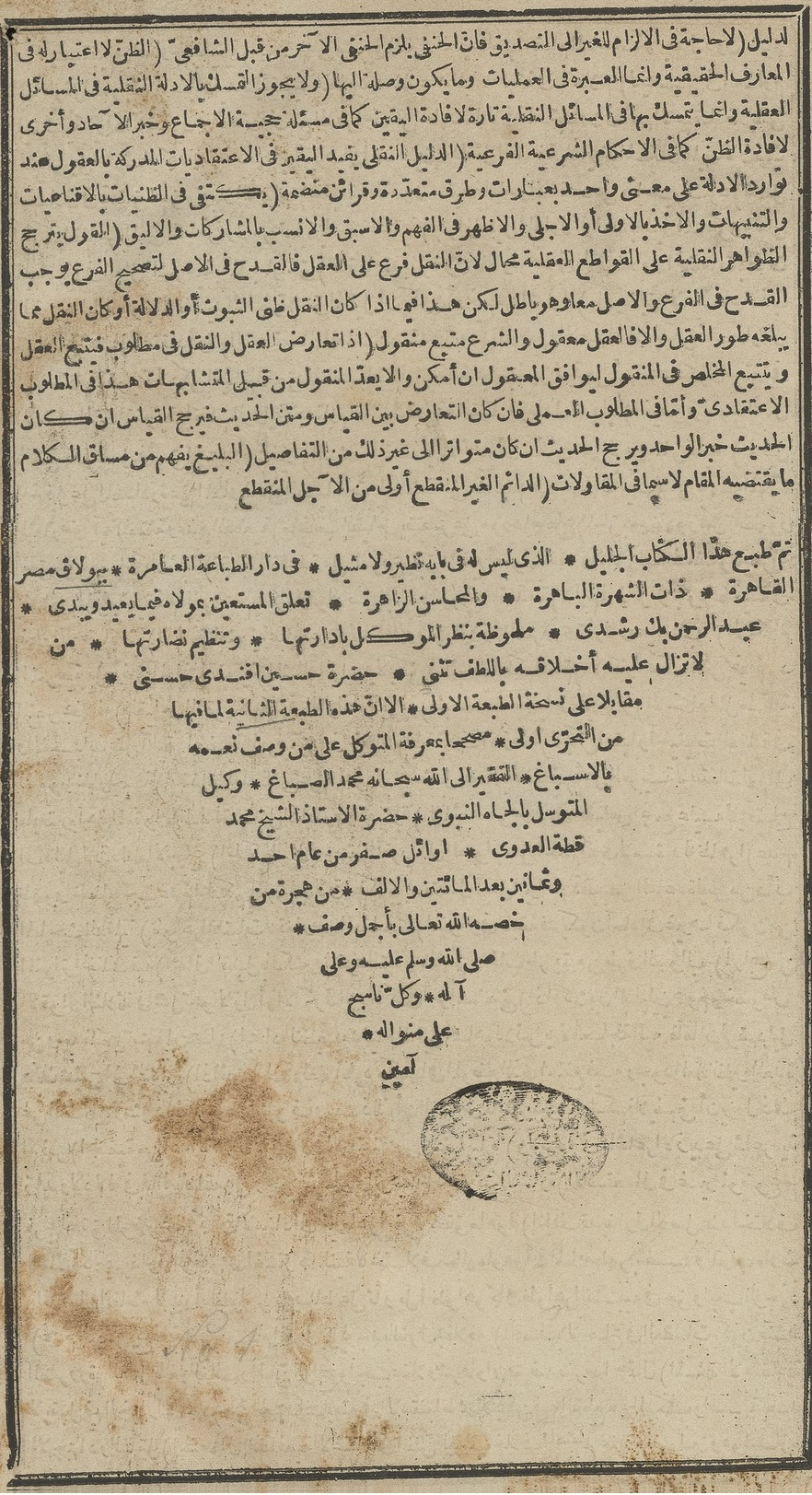
The last page of the second edition of Al-Kulayyat by Al-Kafawi.

Sheikh Yusuf was a distinguished linguist who taught and published extensively on Arabic grammar, morphology, rhetoric, eloquence, and prosody. Many students who attended his classes subsequently achieved eminence as scholars in their respective fields. Upon his arrival in Istanbul, al-Asir was appointed to the position of head of the Correction Bureau in the Ministry of Education and at the imperial printing press, known as "Dar al-Tibaa al-Amira." He devoted considerable time and effort to the editing of printed books, which contributed to their considerable popularity. Among the notable works he corrected was Kitab al-Kulliyat by Abu al-Baqa' al-Kafawi, using the official corrected edition from Bulaq Press, in which he identified several errors.

During that period, American missionaries sought to produce an accurate Arabic translation of the Bible. Following the death of the orientalist Eli Smith, who had initially overseen the project, the task was entrusted to Dr. Cornelius Van Dyck. Van Dyck sought the assistance of Sheikh al-Asir to refine the Arabic text, replacing Butrus al-Bustani and Sheikh Nasif al-Yaziji. This decision was influenced by the termination of Bustani's contract due to Smith's passing and Van Dyck's assertion that Yaziji had not been faithful during his transcription of the second revision of the translation. Consequently, al-Asir became the inaugural Muslim to be commissioned by a Christian institution to refine and edit an Arabic translation of the Bible. He also contributed to the translation of the Acts of the Apostles and the Book of Revelation and composed a multitude of hymns inspired by the Psalms and the Gospels, including a hymn for the American missionaries that incorporated the Ten Commandments.

The American missionary Henry Jessup asserted that al-Asir had taught his children some of the Christian hymns and songs he had helped compose. However, Dr. Mustafa al-Khalidi and the scholar Umar Farrukh contested this claim, characterizing the aforementioned missionary as a purveyor of "fabrications and myths."

In a recent interview, the writer and journalist Faris Nimr revealed that he and his colleague Ya'qub Sarruf were concerned that the publication of their magazine, Al-Muqtataf, might not garner the support of prominent scholars and literary figures of the Arabic language, such as Ahmad Faris al-Shidyaq. Nasif al-Yaziji, Yusuf al-Asir, Ibrahim al-Ahdab, and other prominent figures from the Levant,"They and their followers seldom valued anything beyond the Arabic language, nor did they accord any significance to knowledge outside the realms of its scholars and literary figures."

Father Louis Cheikho observed that Muslim scholars of the Levant influence in elevating literature at the end of the nineteenth century, citing Shaykh Yusuf al-Asir as a prominent figure at the vanguard of this movement. Additionally, poetry constituted a significant aspect of al-Asir's literary persona. As Maroun Abboud posited: "one might venture to state that: One might inquire whether Shaykh Yusuf is also a poet. Affirmative. It was uncommon to encounter a scholar who did not compose poetry. Shaykh Yusuf al-Asir was a highly proficient poet, and his collection comprises odes, muwashshahat, and aphoristic verses."

Abboud described al-Asir's poetry as elegant and articulate, primarily composed in praise, often directed towards his friend Ahmad Faris al-Shidyaq. He likened al-Asir's poetic abilities to those of Shaykh Ibrahim al-Ahdab, although he conceded that the latter produced a greater quantity of work. Al-Asir's poetry frequently manifested his mystical and humble perspective before God, as well as his pride in his Islamic faith and affection for the Quran.

Shaykh al-Asir's poetic oeuvre is the expression of praise and commendation. His eulogies, in particular, are often directed towards his friends and acquaintances, serving as a gesture of recognition and appreciation for their contributions and excellence in their respective fields.

Additionally, Al-Asir examined the genre of romantic poetry, maintaining a sense of modesty and decorum. He discussed descriptions of nature and objects and lauded notable architectural achievements, such as the construction of the Great Omari Mosque in Sidon in 1882. He also commended significant literary and intellectual works, including the play "Arz al-Lubnan," written by the author Marun Al Naqqash.

=== Judiciary, fatwa and fiqh ===
Al-Asir was a prominent jurist of his time, known for his numerous fatwas, independent legal interpretations, and extensive research on various Islamic legal issues. Among his most famous works is "Sharh Ra'id al-Fara'id," a comprehensive treatise on inheritance in Islam according to the Hanafi school of thought, which was the official madhhab of the Ottoman Empire. Notably, al-Asir himself adhered to the Shafi'i school, which led scholars and researchers to praise his broad knowledge and deep understanding of Islamic jurisprudence. In this book, al-Asir meticulously detailed the principles of inheritance, stating that male heirs fall into sixteen categories and female heirs into twelve. He clarified the shares and proportions of inheritance, categorizing them into six divisions: one-sixth, one-third, two-thirds, one-eighth, one-quarter, and one-half, with a seventh share determined by independent legal reasoning (ijtihad).

=== Students and contemporaries ===
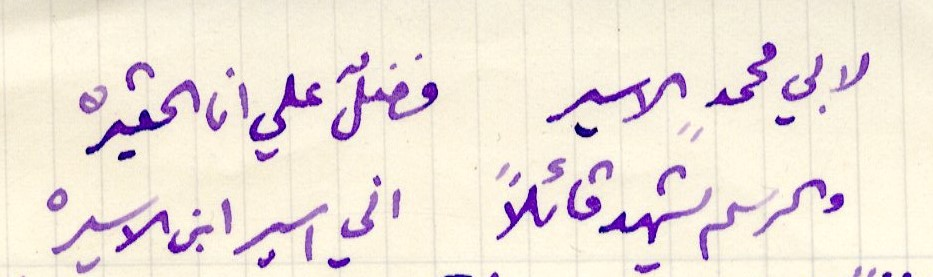
Verses written by Penguin Haddad in recognition of the prisoner's thanks to him. Transcribed from the original and written by the scholar Issa Iskandar al-Maalouf.

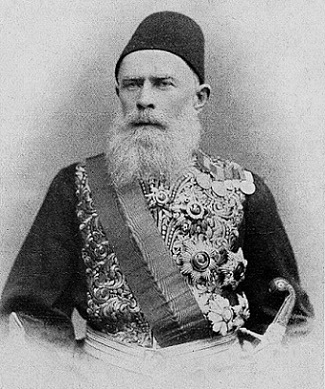
Ulema Ahmad Jawdat Pasha, one of the most prominent Ottoman scholars who studied under al-Asir during his stay in Istanbul.

Al-Asir educated generations of writers, poets, jurists, judges, and politicians. Among his students were individuals who subsequently held high-ranking positions in the Ottoman state and distinguished military roles. He also instructed some Western missionaries and educators who sought to learn Arabic and its associated sciences.

In Istanbul, his students included Safwat Pasha, minister of the interior; Muhammad Rushdi Pasha al-Sharwani, the grand vizier; Ahmed Cevdet Pasha, minister of education; and Nicolas Prosper Bourée, the French ambassador to the Ottoman Empire.

In the Levant, his students included Sheikh Muhammad bin Qasim al-Kusti, Judge of Beirut; Georges Bek Safa, who served as a judge in the Matn Court, then in the Court of Appeals in Mount Lebanon, and later as a member of the Supreme Court of Cassation upon the establishment of Greater Lebanon, and eventually as President of the Court of Appeals for Civil and Commercial Matters in Beirut. His students also included Sheikh Habib Lutfi Allah, Qaim Maqam of Zahle, who served as a member of the Court of Appeals for Civil and Commercial Matters in Beirut; Gregory IV Haddad, who became the Patriarch of Antioch for the Greek Orthodox Church; and John the Priest, Patriarch of the Maronites, and Bishop John al-Habib, founder of the Maronite Lebanese Missionary Society. Additionally, he fostered a productive relationship with Sheikh Muhammad Rashid bin Mustafa al-Miqati, a distinguished scholar hailing from Tripoli in the Levant.

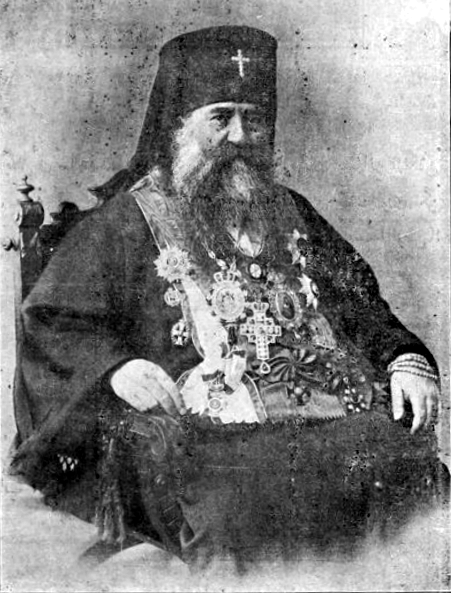
The Greek Orthodox Patriarch of Antioch and All the East, Gregory IV Haddad, is one of the most prominent Syrian disciples of al-Assir.

Al-Asir educated generations of writers, poets, jurists, judges, and politicians. Among his students were individuals who subsequently held high-ranking positions in the Ottoman state and distinguished military roles. He also instructed some Western missionaries and educators who sought to learn Arabic and its associated sciences.

In Istanbul, his students included Safwat Pasha, minister of the interior; Muhammad Rushdi Pasha al-Sharwani, the grand vizier; Ahmed Joudet Pasha, minister of education; and Nicolas Prosper Bourée, the French ambassador to the Ottoman Empire.

His Levantine students included Anton Ammoun, who served as President of the Mount Lebanon Administrative Council during the tenure of Mutasarrif Rustem Pasha; Nicola Chammaa, a pioneer in translating significant Ottoman laws and decrees into Arabic; and Salim Baz, who provided the most comprehensive commentary on the Majalla al-Ahkam al-Adliyya (Ottoman Civil Code) in the Arab regions. Among the lawyers who studied under him at the School of Wisdom and elsewhere were Asaad Aql, founder of the newspaper al-Bayraq, and Wadie Naeem, who became a minister and a member of the Lebanese Parliament, and the father of Edmond Naïm, Governor of the Banque du Liban(1985–1991). Among the foreign missionaries who acquired proficiency in Arabic from him were Dr. Ali Smith and Dr. Cornelius Van Dyck, with whom Sheikh Yusuf developed a lifelong friendship. Additionally, Dr. Martin Hartmann, professor of Arabic at the School of Oriental Languages in Berlin, was also among his students.

Female students also benefited from Sheikh Yusuf al-Asir's pedagogical expertise. One notable student was Louise, the daughter of the French consul in Sidon and wife of Diab Effendi, head of the Foreign Affairs Office in the Mount Lebanon Mutasarrifate. Through her assiduous study under Sheikh Yusuf, she acquired proficiency in Arabic, encompassing reading, writing, prose, and poetry. It is documented that she subsequently composed a laudatory poem in honour of the Bey of Tunis.

Among al-Asir's contemporaries were numerous individuals from a variety of fields, including politicians, scholars, judges, journalists, writers, and poets. In Egypt, he was contemporaneous with the prominent figures Jamal al-Din al-Afghani and Muhammad Abduh, as well as the scholars Muhammad al-Tantawi and Hassan al-Qawasni. In the Levant, he resided with Sheikh Abu al-Hassan al-Kusti and his son Muhammad, as well as Sheikh Ibrahim al-Ahdeb. Notable figures in the realms of language and literature included Ahmad Faris al-Shidyaq, the two Sheikh Nasif and Ibrahim al-Yaziji, teacher Butros al-Bustani and his son Salim, Hajj Hussein Bayhum, Omar Onsi, Khalil Elias Sarkis, and Sheikh Abdul Qadir al-Qabbani.

Additionally, al-Asir observed the tenures of five Ottoman sultans. Mahmud II, his sons Abdülmecid I and Abdulaziz, and his grandsons Murad V and Abdulhamid II. He witnessed the rule of numerous Egyptian monarchs belonging to the Alawite dynasty. The sequence of rulers included Muhammad Ali Pasha and his son Ibrahim, followed by Abbas Helmy I, Muhammad Said Pasha, Ismail Pasha, and Tawfiq Pasha. Furthermore, he lived through the tenures of four Mutasarrifs of Mount Lebanon: Dawood Pasha, Franco Pasha, Rustem Pasha, and Wassa Pasha. He also observed the administrations of several governors of Sidon, including Izzat Ahmed Pasha and Mahmud Nedim Pasha, as well as the inaugural governor of Beirut, Ali Pasha al-Sharabji.

== Thoughts ==
=== In Politics and Reform ===
By the late 19th century, three principal political orientations had emerged among the intellectuals, reformers, and thinkers within the Ottoman Empire.

==== The Islamic Movement ====
The movement, spearheaded by Sultan Abdul Hamid II, advocated for Islamic unity under the Ottoman Caliphate through the establishment of the "Islamic League." The objective of this movement was to liberate the Islamic countries in Maghreb, Central and South Asia, which were under the control of Western colonial powers, and to advance Muslims intellectually and spiritually. This current aimed to liberate the Islamic countries in the Maghreb, Central and South Asia, which were under the control of Western colonial powers, to advance Muslims intellectually and spiritually, to raise them to the level of free and advanced peoples, and to apply Islamic law in a manner that was appropriate to the requirements of the times.

==== The Ottoman Movement ====
The objective is to safeguard the constitutional order within the Ottoman state and to attain equality among all Ottoman citizens of diverse ethnicities, nationalities, and religions by uniting them into a unified nation.

==== The Arab Current ====
The objective was to attain autonomy for the Arab-majority states while maintaining their affiliation with the Ottoman Empire. This entailed the implementation of a system of administrative decentralization, whereby the Arab states were to exercise their governance independently.

He called for reform within the Ottoman state and through the authority itself and the framework of Islam. He believed that politicians, including ministers and others, were responsible for the corruption and backwardness of the country and that they needed to be reformed, but the Sultan was the symbol of Muslim unity and the relic of Islam, so his position had to be preserved. The prisoner used the press as a platform to call for reform, the duty of justice to prevail among the people, and the need to spread the principles of freedom among them. He was characterized by his careful choice of words and phrases so as not to offend the Sultan or incite the public against him, such as, "It is no secret that to obey the Sultan is to obey the Merciful, so if he is just, he has the reward and the subjects must be grateful, and if he is unjust, he has the punishment and the subjects must be patient. It has been said that praying to the sultan is one of the greatest acts of worship because it is of public benefit... The corruption of the subjects without the Sultan is like the corruption of the body without the soul, and he is in the people as the head is in the body. He must also take care of their conditions and the success of their deeds..."

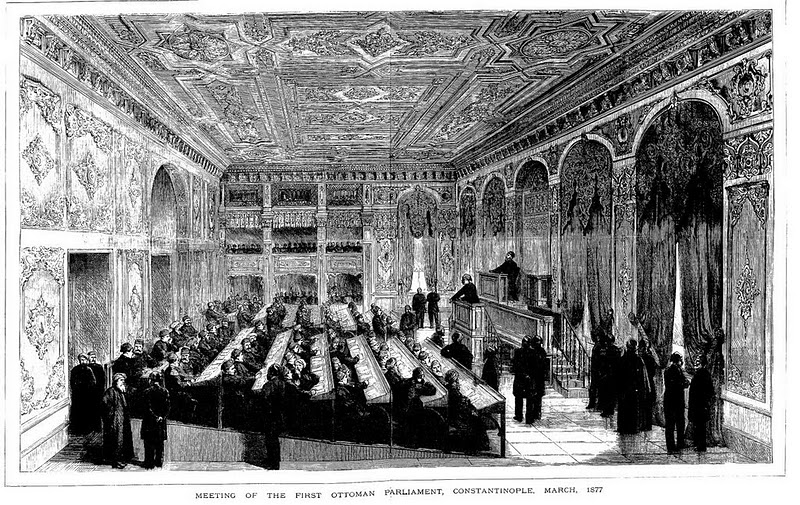
The first session of the Ottoman Envoy Council in 1877.

Al-Asir endorsed the Himayani Sharif line, which was issued in 1876, and which included a number of reforms to the Ottoman state. The most significant of these was the establishment of the Envoys' Council, which was the first representative parliament of the Ottomans. He posited that the primary causes of the Ottoman state's delay were the failure to adhere to the tenets of Shari'ah, which permitted the governors to act in accordance with their personal desires, thereby contravening the established rules. He underscored the importance of aligning legislation with the tenets of Islamic law, emphasizing its intrinsic value to the people and its capacity to confer benefits and promote well-being. The prisoner advocated for placing the most suitable individual in the most appropriate position and conferring upon them the requisite authority to fulfill their responsibilities, rather than transferring them from their post unnecessarily so that they can serve the people and reform their affairs over the long term.

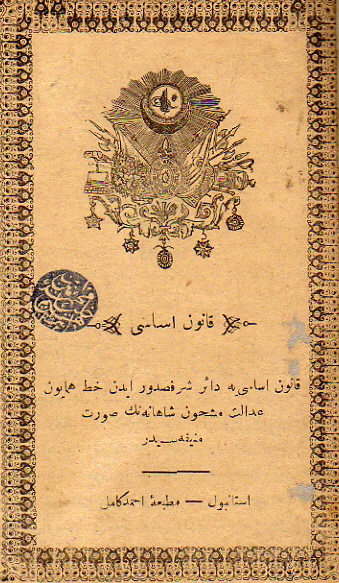
The cover of the Basic Law or Ottoman Constitution issued in 1876.

Al-Asir underscored the vital importance of disseminating knowledge and information, citing its profound impact on the country's prosperity and advancement. He posited that the populace was both willing and capable of achieving this, drawing upon their inherent intelligence and insight. He advocated for the enhancement of industrial, commercial, and agricultural conditions, a strategy commonly employed by nations with the objective of improving the well-being of their citizens.

Al-Asir posited that one of the primary causes of the Ottoman Empire's decline was the pervasive corruption within its financial administration. He observed that Sultan Abdulmejid had bequeathed a national debt of four million liras, a portion of which was incurred during the Crimean War and the suppression of major sectarian strife in the Levant, as well as the subsequent efforts to address its consequences. By the conclusion of Sultan Abdulaziz's tenure, the national debt had reached 250 million liras, despite a dearth of substantial investment in the country's development and progress. This inadequate administration also contributed to the unrest in Bosnia and Herzegovina. He posited that reform was a fundamental prerequisite for progress and growth in the Islamic world and that the failure to implement it was the root cause of the region's decline, fragmentation, and advancement of external powers. He attributed the Russo-Turkish War, which had resulted in the depletion of the country's resources and human capital at the time of writing, to the failure of both politicians and the public to fulfill their obligations about reform.

Al-Asir highlighted that one of the fundamental tenets of Islam at the time was the establishment of a basic legal framework, namely the Ottoman constitution. He underscored the obligation of all individuals to support reform, particularly given their responsibility to elect members of the Chamber of Deputies, who were entrusted with the crucial roles of reform and lawmaking. He underscored the importance of electing individuals with laudable intentions and exemplary competence, who are concerned with the public good rather than personal interests, as a means of accelerating reform and fostering the country's enhanced progress and prosperity. Al-Asir counseled the Ottomans to elect capable and competent individuals without succumbing to pressure from any official, particularly in light of the new governor of Syria (Midhat Pasha) being resolute in implementing the requisite changes.

=== In Religion and Society ===
Sheikh Yusuf al-Asir was a devout Muslim, characterized by piety and devotion. He was well versed in religious matters, including jurisprudence and other subjects, and was receptive to the tenets of other faiths and the three Islamic schools of thought, with the exception of his own Shafi'i school. He maintained a keen interest in the affairs of Sidon, his hometown, despite his permanent residence in Beirut. Members of the Society for the Propagation of Knowledge and Virtue would visit him at his residence in Beirut during the latter half of Ramadan each year. During these visits, they discussed matters pertaining to Saida, including ways to enhance the city's scientific and cultural standing. They also engaged in discourse regarding the activities of the aforementioned society. Additionally, the members received donations amassed by al-Assir himself. Al-Assir regarded the education of girls as a crucial and indispensable aspect, one that would prove beneficial to them and the nation at large. Nevertheless, he gravitated towards imparting knowledge and skills that would be advantageous in their domestic lives, such as sewing, embroidery, and other related disciplines.

== Effects ==
=== Annotations ===
Sheikh Yusuf al-Asir has authored numerous commentaries and explanations on a variety of literary works, including:

1. Qamous Mwase'a Fe Allogha This work was not published.
2. Moqadema motawla"A lengthy introduction" to the Maqamat al-Hariri.
3. A valuable, extensive commentary on al-Taftazani's Sharh al-Talkhis in the fields of semantics and rhetoric: Most of this work was lost, with only thirty pages from the beginning preserved by al-Asir's student, George Safa.
4. A concise explanation of the Badi'iyyah by Safi al-Din al-Hilli.
5. A commentary on the explanation of the Ten Articles by al-Dawraqi.
6. A commentary on the Isagoge in logic attributed to Athir al-Din al-Abhari.
7. A brief explanation of the Lamiyyat al-'Arab.

=== Theaters ===
Some sources that translate the lives of Arab and Muslim figures have reported that al-Asir was the author of several plays or novels. Vicomte Philippe de Tarrazi has stated that al-Asir authored a play entitled "Seif Al-Nasr." The proceeds from its performances were allocated to purchase printing equipment for the newspaper Thamarat al-Funun at the time of its establishment. Maron Abbud observed that the anthology of Omar Onsi contains a reference to a play attributed to al-Asir, entitled "The Book of Thoughts." Yusuf As'ad Dagher posited that "Seif Al-Nasr" is, in fact, a novel rather than a play.

=== Resalet Al-Garad ===
In 1865, a brief pamphlet comprising twelve pages was published in Beirut. This scientific treatise provides a detailed account of the various types, names, and characteristics of locusts. The pamphlet lacks a clearly defined structure and is not organized into sections. However, its content can be summarized as follows: an introduction, a description of locusts, their reproduction process, and the names and meanings of locusts. The text asserts that locusts are edible, though few people consume them, not due to any religious prohibition but because of a lack of familiarity with them. It then concludes by appealing to God to protect people from the dangers of locusts, as swarms of them can lead to a disasters.

=== Sharh Atwaq al-Dhahab fi al-Mawa'iz wa al-Khutab ===
This modest volume comprises 108 pages and encompasses 100 articles on sermons, counsel, moral virtues, and wisdom. It is authored by the esteemed scholar Abu al-Qasim Mahmoud bin Omar al-Zamakhshari and features annotations and elucidations by Sheikh al-Asir.

=== Ershad Al-Wary L-Nar Al-Qura ===
This brief volume, comprising 93 pages, represents al-Asir's response to Sheikh Nasif al-Yaziji's book, "Nar al-Qura fi Jawf al-Fara," which offers a critique of linguistic usage. Al-Asir offered a forceful critique of Yaziji's work, arguing that while Yaziji sought to enhance the Arabic language, he should have first refined and selected his vocabulary. In his critique, al-Asir employed a sharp and sarcastic tone, and he stated that the issue raised by Yazigi is challenging to resolve.

=== Rad Al-Shahm Llsahm ===
This modest volume, comprising just 56 pages, was conceived as a rejoinder to Sa'id al-Shartouni's treatise, "Al-Sahm al-Sa'ib," which itself represented a critique of Ahmad Faris al-Shidyaq's work, "Ghuniyat al-Talib." Al-Asir commences his critique of al-Shartouni's book with a scathing indictment, asserting that the author "Gaa' mn Shartoun Fa Waqa'a Fe Shar Amoun" and that by challenging al-Shidyaq's work, al-Shartouni "Fa'al Kama Al-Asfour Alze Hareb Basheqan Le Khefeto W Qelet A'aqlo" In the remainder of the book, al-Asir provides a detailed account of the errors he believes al-Shartouni made, with a particular focus on mistakes in Arabic grammar.

=== Sharh Ra'ed Al Fara'ed ===
The book comprises 285 pages and is primarily concerned with the subject of inheritance in Islam as interpreted by the Hanafi school of thought. The author, Al-Asir, was a follower of the Shafi'i school. The book commences with an observation that the domain of inheritance law constitutes one of the most esteemed and comprehensive branches of Islamic scholarship, a view that is echoed by Muhammad, who advocated for its study and dissemination. Al-Asir states that he authored this work due to the complexity of this field, aiming to simplify its intricacies for the public. He chose the Hanafi school because it was the official madhhab of the Ottoman Empire.

Al-Asir divided the book into nine chapters, containing six sections. The chapters are as follows:

1. The Chapter on Inheritance ( Al Waratha)
2. The Chapter on Al-Fard
3. The Chapter on Al-Awl
4. The Chapter on Al-Radd
5. The Chapter on Al-Tasib
6. The Chapter on Al-Hajb
7. The Chapter on Al-Hisab
8. The Chapter on Al-Munasakha
9. The Chapter on Auliy al-Arham

=== Diwan Al-Rawd Al-Areed ===
This poetry collection encompasses the majority of Al-Asir's poetic works, comprising eighty pages in a compact format. The collection contains multiple poems comprising several hundred verses, which explore a diverse array of themes. These include but are not limited to, description, lamentation, love, praise, elegy, and the recording of events and architectural works. The introduction was authored by Sheikh Ibrahim bin Abdul Rahman Al-Majzoub in Beirut, and the publication was financed by him as well.

The collection includes four muwashshahat (lyric poems), twenty-eight poems of praise, four elegies, nine commendations, and the remaining verses document births, deaths, and the renovation of certain mosques. Additionally, the collection features three poems praising Sheikh Ibrahim Al-Ahdab, Sheikh Abu Al-Hasan Al-Kusti, and Ibrahim Al-Majzoub, the compiler of the collection.
