= Youssef Howayek =

Lebanese artist

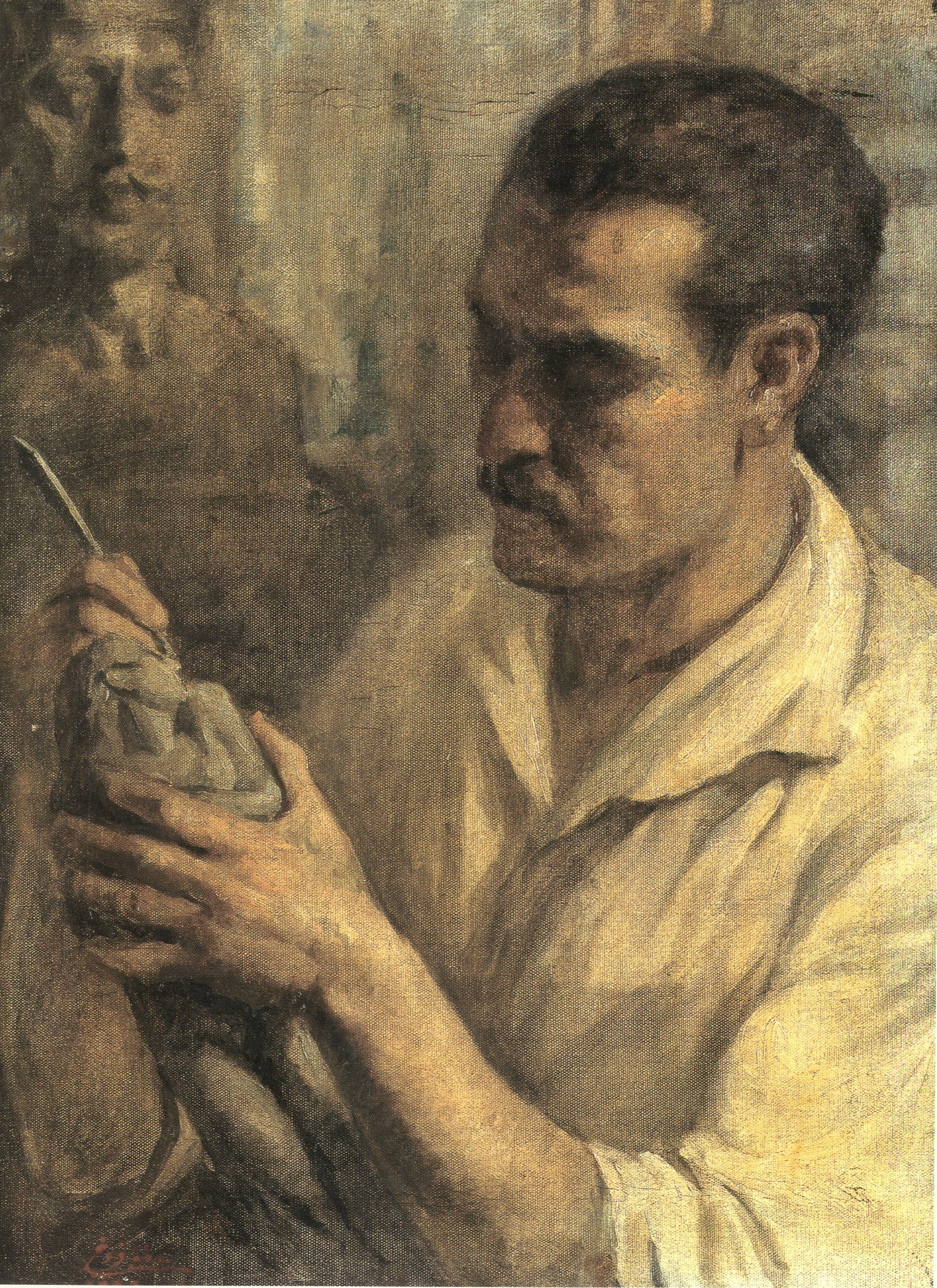
- Born: 1883; Helta, Mount Lebanon Mutasarrifate, Ottoman Empire
- Died: 1962 (aged 78–79); Helta, Lebanon
- Occupation: Visual artist

Youssef Saadallah Howayek (Arabic: يوسف حويك; also Yusuf Huwayyik, Hoyek, Hoayek, Hawayek) (1883–1962) was a painter, sculptor and writer from Helta, in modern-day Lebanon.

== Career ==
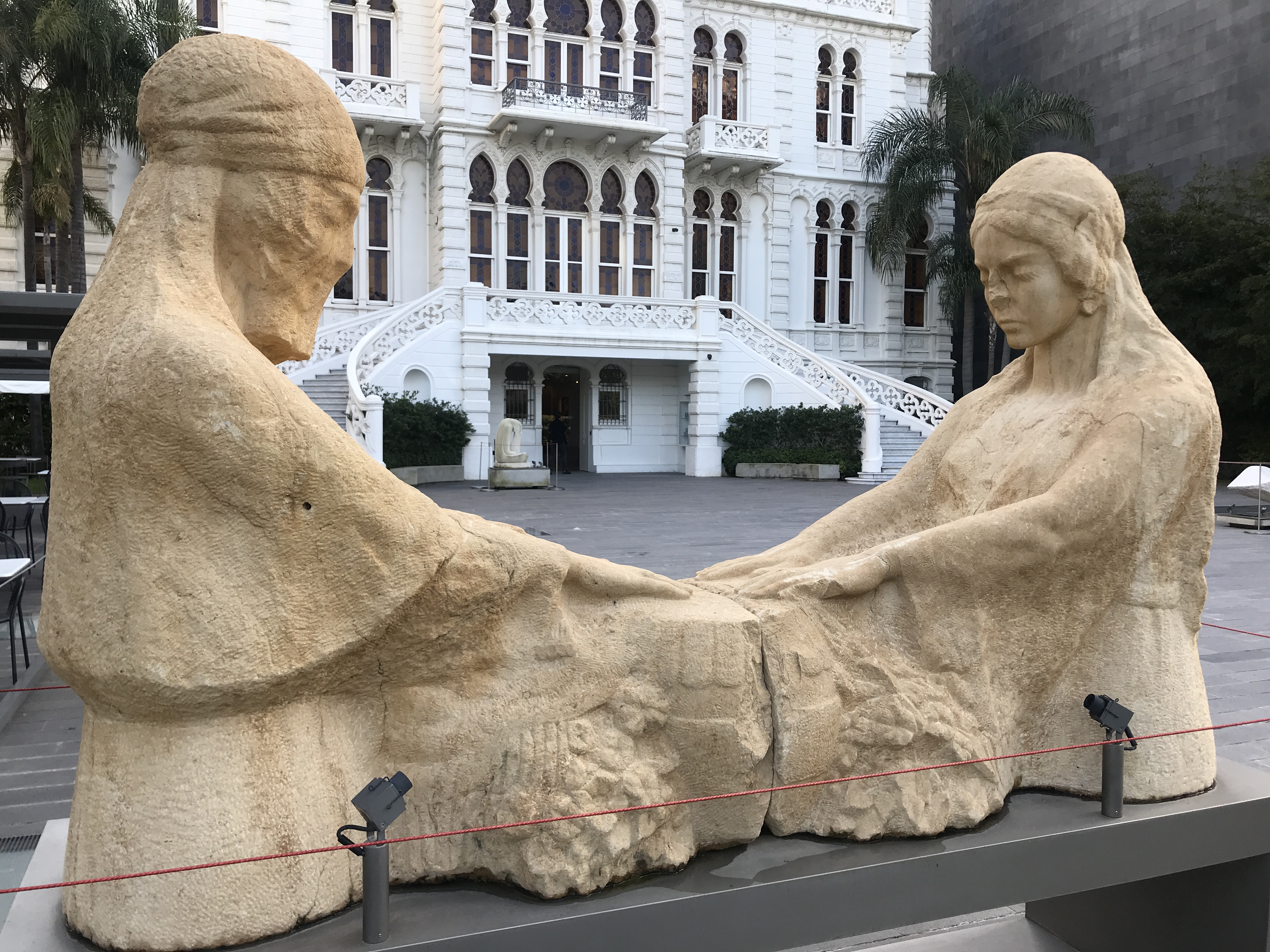
Original martyrs' memorial, Les pleureuses (the weeping women) by Youssef Hoyek, (1930). Now in the Sursock Museum

Youssef Howayek's father, Saadallah Howayek, was a Councillor elected into the Ottoman Mutasarref's (Governor) Administrative Council. His grandfather was the village priest and his uncle was the Patriarch Howayek.

He first travelled to Rome and studied the various forms of art. His first passion was painting. Focusing on the cultural shock observed by a young Lebanese mountain dweller in contact with a major European city like Rome.

He later moved to Paris to join Khalil Gibran who had come from the other side of the Atlantic. Gibran and Howayek had known each other from Lebanon, and became closer friends in Paris being from the same part of the world and the same age. They also had the same passion for painting and sculpture, studying art with Auguste Rodin for two years (1909 and 1910). Ameen Rihani joined them in Paris for a short while. Also in Paris he met Isadora Duncan who bought two paintings from him for 500 French francs. In Paris, he is known to have socialised at Le Dome Cafe in Montparnasse.

He writes in his memoirs that his favourite book was "Histoire des origines du Christianisme", by Ernest Renan. Youssef Howayek is known to have started translating Dante's The Divine Comedy to Arabic. It is not known if he completed it.

== Writings ==
“Gibran Khalil Gibran in Paris” Memories of Youssef Al Howayek: FMA, Paris 1995. Translated to French by Edvick Shayboub. Translated to English by Matti Moosa. Yusuf Huwayyik : Gibran in Paris (1976 Popular Library, NY)

== Paintings ==
He painted the "Our Lady of Seven Sorrows" and "Christ in the Garden of Olives" and donated them to the Daughters of Charity of Saint Vincent de Paul, Paris.

== Sculptures ==
- Sculpture of the Patriarch Elias Howayek
- Sculpture of Youssef Bey Karam
- Sculpture of Daoud Corm, the painter
- Sculpture of the Vierge de Boulogne in 1938.
- The first sculpture for Martyrs Square in Beirut (in 1916 the square was named Martyrs Square in tribute to the Lebanese nationalists executed by the Ottomans. The first Martyrs' Monument is of two women, a Muslim and a Christian. It is now exhibited in Sursok Museum garden.)

"The soul is a heavenly flower that cannot live in the shade, but thorns can live everywhere." This is from a letter to Youssef Howayek from Gibran in 1911. From Kahlil Gibrarn: A Self-Portrait. (FIUL, Citadel Press, 1959), p. 26. FLOWERS; MAN; SHADE; SOULS; THORNS 19870300
