= Howayek (surname) =

The surname Howayek, Hoyek, Hawayek, Hayek (in Arabic حايك / حويّك / الحويّك) and its variants is an Arabic surname, common among the Maronite Catholics of Lebanon. The majority of the members live in three Lebanese towns Bdadoun, Hsarat and Helta; the remainder is scattered among other smaller towns and in the diaspora.

== History ==
=== Roots ===
Howayek have their origins in the Arab Christian tribe of the Ghassanids (Bani Ghassan بني غسان). They include the Maalouf and Jebara families. Those families originally settled in Houran, southern Lebanon. The Hawayek family was mostly settled in Sirghaya, in south west Lebanon.

=== Emigration to Mount Lebanon ===
After the Crusaders' departed the Middle East the Christian communities fell victim to the persecution of the Mameluks and the Ottoman Turks after them. The Mameluks had conquered Syria and Lebanon and remained rulers until the early 16th century when they themselves were consumed by the expanding Ottoman Empire.

The Howayek family refugees maintained their community life around their Maronite patriarchate along with the majority of the Maronite Christian families who preferred this system to the alternatives. The relatively uninhabited Keserwan region in Lebanon allowed for Maronite settlement and the patriarchate was established in Batroun, North Lebanon. The Hawayek clan was known to centre on the town of Hsarat, Mount Lebanon, in the 18th century.

=== Registering the name Hawayek ===
With the move to Mount Lebanon the families were required to register with the Ottoman Turkish authorities. Because the majority were weavers the Ottoman registration office in Batroun recorded them as Houwayyek (meaning weaver). Others believe that the name is after the plant (Haeik, الحائك).

=== Expansion in Lebanon ===
The demographic expansion of the Maronite Christians continued towards the Chouf and Metn. This resulted in the Hawayek family splitting into the main three locations they are found in today. With the Chouf exodus went the Hawayeks that settled in Bdadoun, and in the 19th century part of them moved and settled in Helta in the North of Lebanon.
Since then they moved into other parts of the Lebanon: Amsheet, in Byblos; Jdeidet, in Metn; and Lebanese capital city of Beirut (Greater Beirut). They are known to be also located in the following places: Ain Saadeh, Bsaeba, Baabda, Hadath, Bawshriyeh, Jezzine, Rashkideh and Aoura.

=== Land ownership ===
The peasants in the Lebanon did not own the land they worked which was owned by the Christian feudal lords who gave the farmers an allowance for the work they did. Unlike North Lebanon the Chouf region belonged to the Druze lords and did not fall under the Christian fiefdoms. This now meant that the Hawayeks who moved there had to take farming jobs under new rules as they were not allowed to own land. The Hawayeks who remained in the North owned the land they worked on. As the population grew the Druze lords allowed the peasants to build Churches on their land. In later years the Druze chieftains paid the farmers by allocating them land. It is only at that time that the Hawayeks began to own land in the Chouf and Aley districts.

=== Education ===
At the turn of the 20th century the improved financial status of the family allowed its children higher education than was previously possible. Many received their education from the country's higher education institutions and some travelled abroad to study.

=== Immigration ===
With all the Lebanese waves of emigration people from the Hawayek family also left. The Ottoman period, the Lebanese Civil War and the later economic decline all caused members of the Hawayek to flee Lebanon seeking security and economic stability. A large section of the family emigrated to countries outside Lebanon and mainly to the United States, Canada, France, Argentina, Brazil or Australia.

== Transliterations and spellings ==
Different transliterations and spellings for the Arabic word for Howayek are extant:

Hawayek is used by the majority of English settled members of the family as well as those that migrated to North and South America (United States, Canada, Argentina, Brazil, Mexico, Puerto Rico, etc.).

Hoyek, Huayek and Juayek is mostly used by the French settled members of the family. The Maronite Church chose Hoyek as a spelling for the Patriarch Hoyek.

The name has changed considerably to "Howard" in the United States. Phillip Perlmutter said that "Lebanese Maronite names like Aoun and Howayek were transformed to Owen and Howard".

A list of the known spellings follows:

- Chalhoub Howayek (Professor Youssef Chalhoub Howayek's Diploma Of Study From College De La Sagesse)
- El-Houwayek
- El Houayek
- El Hoayek
- El Howayek
- El Howayeck
- El-Hoyek
- El-Huaick
- El-Jaick
- Haeick
- Hayek
- Hawayek
- Hoayeck
- Hoayek
- Houayek
- Houwayek
- Howayeck
- Howayek
- Hoyeck
- Hoyek
- Huayek
- Huwayyik
- Hwayek
- Juallek
- Juayek
- Jouhayerk
- El-Huaiek

== Use of the name ==
Shaqif al Huwayyik, a mound or hill in the Beqaa, Lebanon

Alternative Name: Shaqif al Houwayek Area: Al Beqaa, in Lebanon Coordinates & Location type: Area Type: Hypsographic Location Type: Slope Latitude: 33.54306 Longitude: 35.75278 (Decimal degrees) Latitude (DMS): 33° 32' 35 N Longitude (DMS): 35° 45' 10 E (Degrees, minutes and seconds)

Çatal Höyük, a mound or hill close to Konya, Turkey. See Çatalhöyük.

Alternative Name: Çatal Hüyük Area: Konya, in Turkey Coordinates & Location type: Latitude: 37.66° Longitude: 32.753333° (Decimal degrees) Latitude (DMS): 37° 39′ 36″ N Longitude (DMS): 32° 45′ 12″ E (Degrees, minutes and seconds)

== List of people with the surname Howayek ==
- Elias Peter Hoayek (1843–1931), Maronite Patriarch of Antioch
- Kaitlin Hawayek, American ice dancer
- Saadallah Howayek (1853–1915), Member of Mount Lebanon's first administrative council
- Salma Hayek (born in 1966), Mexican–American film actress and producer, of Lebanese descent
- Youssef (Joseph) Howayek (1883–1962), Lebanese sculptor and painter

== See also ==
- Hayek
