= Thamarāt al Funūn =

Biweekly newspaper in Lebanon (1875–1908)

- Type: Biweekly newspaper
- Founder: Jamʿiyyat al-Funun
- Founded: 20 April 1875
- Ceased publication: 20 November 1908
- Language: Arabic
- Headquarters: Beirut
- Country: Lebanon
- OCLC number: 809953261

Thamarāt al Funūn (Arabic: ثمرات الفنون, lit. 'Fruit of the Arts') was a Lebanese biweekly that was published between 1875 and 1908 in Beirut. It was one of the significant publications and the sole media outlet of the Lebanese Muslims during that period. It circulated regionally as part of the rising Arabic-language press of the mid-19th century.

== History and profile ==
Thamarāt al Funūn was launched in 1875, and the first issue appeared on 20 April 1875. The founding owner of the biweekly was Jamʿiyyat al-Funun (Arabic: Society of the Arts) led by Saad al Din Hamada. The paper was started as a reaction of the educated Muslims to the domination of the publications established by the Christian figures in Beirut. When the society was closed, Abdel Qader Qabbani bought the biweekly. He was also one of the editors-in-chief of the paper, which was a supporter of the Ottoman Empire.

The paper was founded with a social mission, the first issue declaring: "It is not hidden that the newspapers of this age are the cause of progress…because they spread the good deeds of the good people and the bad deeds of the bad people…and it presents to you feasts of useful information."

Another editor-in-chief was Yusuf Al Asir, who also edited Lisan Al Hal. Al Asir attempt to produce a synthesis between the East and West in Thamarāt al Funūn.

The headquarters of Thamarāt al Funūn was in Beirut, but it was also circulated in the Hijaz on the Arabian Peninsula. The paper ended publication in 1908 (the year of the Young Turk Revolution in the Ottoman Empire), and the last issue was dated 20 November 1908.

== Contributors and content ==
In addition to Muslim contributors, some significant Christian authors also published articles in Thamarāt al Funūn, including Adib Ishaq and Yaqub Sarruf.

Thamarāt al Funūn initially produced news based on the translations of the telegraph messages sent by the major news agencies such as Reuters and Havas. Frequent topics featured in the paper included the status of women and education. Contemporary debates about Ottoman politics and 19th century reform also appeared in the paper's editorials. In general, the paper addressed issues of common concern in the Arabic-language press during the Nahda era, which also included questions of modernization, Westernization, comparative culture, national identity, and liberalism. The paper is seen as drawing more from Islamic heritage and politics than other leading secular publications with related readerships at the time.

From the 1890s the biweekly adopted a conservative Islamist approach and frequently featured the writings of the leading conservative figures such as Mohammad Abduh and Ahmad Tabbara. The latter replaced Abdel Qader Qabbani as the editor-in-chief in 1898. During the editorship of Abdel Qader Qabbani Thamarāt al Funūn covered the Dreyfus affair in detail and argued that this incident was a result of the failure of French politics in realizing its ideal of citizenship.

The paper was subject to censorship exerted by the Ottomans, especially during the Hamidian period. For instance, the biweekly published news on the deaths of leading statesmen of the period such as French President Sadi Carnot, Qajar ruler Nasir al Din Shah and Italian King Umberto who were all assassinated without using the word assassination.

== Legacy ==
Donald J. Cioeta's 1979 PhD thesis at the University of Chicago, Thamarat al funun, Syria's first Islamic newspaper, 1875-1908, provides an analysis of the paper.

A full text digital copy of the paper was made available open-access through the American University of Beirut in 2021.
