= Helta =

Town in North Lebanon

Helta حلتا
- City
- Location within Lebanon
- Coordinates: 34.2333°N 35.7833°E
- Country: Lebanon
- Governorate: North Governorate
- District: Batroun District
- Elevation: 564 m (1,850 ft)
- Time zone: UTC+2 (EET)
  - Summer (DST): UTC+3 (EEST)
- Dialing code: +961

Helta (Arabic: حلتا, romanized: Ḥeltā) is a town in North Lebanon. It had 393 registered voters as of 2017, all Maronites. As of 2014, Howayek was the most common surname in the town, being held by 123 of 385 voters.

== Demographics ==
In 2014 Christians made up 99.74% of registered voters in Helta. 92.99% of the voters were Maronite Catholics.

== People from Helta ==
- Elias Peter Hoayek (1843–1931)
- Saadallah Howayek (1853–)
- Youssef Howayek (1883–1962)
