= John Peter El Hajj =

Head of the Maronite Church from 1890 to 1898

John XII Peter El Hajj يوحنا الثاني عشر بطرس الحاج
- Patriarch of Antioch
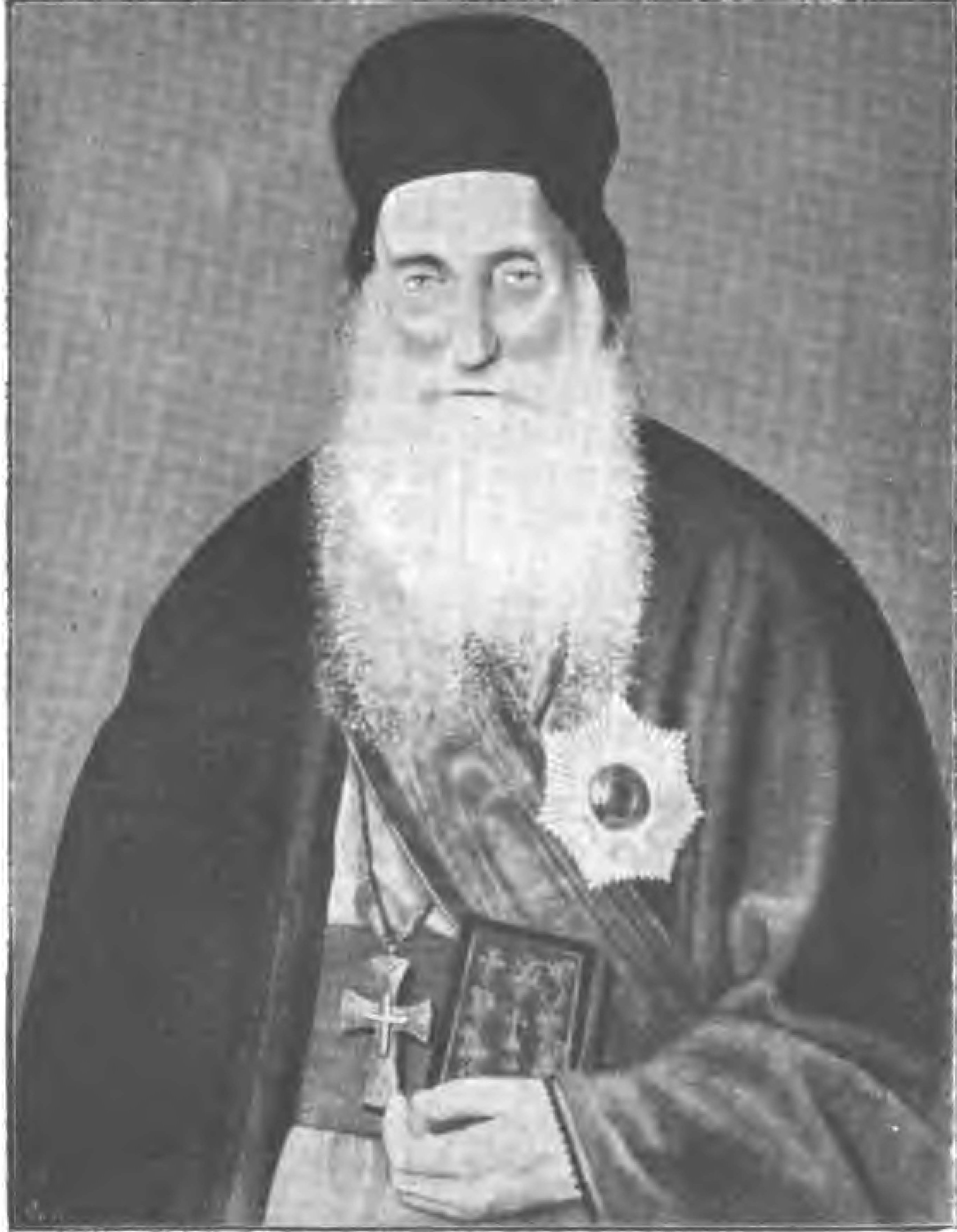
- Church: Maronite Church
- See: Patriarch of Antioch
- Elected: April 28, 1890
- Term ended: December 24, 1898
- Predecessor: Paul Peter Massad
- Successor: Elias Peter Hoayek

Orders
- Ordination: December 26, 1839 (Priest)
- Consecration: August 15, 1861 (Bishop)

Personal details
- Born: November 1, 1817 Dlebta, Keserwan District
- Died: December 24, 1898 (aged 81) Bkerké, Lebanon

John XII Peter El Hajj (1 November 1817 in Dlebta, Keserwan District – 24 December 1898 in Bkerké), (or Youhanna Boutros El Hajj, El-Hage, El-Haj, El-Hadj, Arabic: يوحنا الثاني عشر بطرس الحاج), was the 71st Maronite Patriarch of Antioch from 1890 until his death in 1898. He was previously Eparch of Baalbek-Deir El Ahmar.

== Life ==
John Peter El Hajj was born in the village of Dlebta, in the Keserwan District, Lebanon on November 1, 1817, son of the priest of the village. He studied in the seminary of 'Ain-Warka and was ordinated priest on December 26, 1839.

After having studied Islamic law, on May 10, 1844, he was appointed judge in Mount Lebanon, a position he held till 1855, when he became secretary of Archbishop Paolo Brunoni, a Cypriot who was the Apostolic Legate of Syria. During the 1860 Lebanon conflict he took refuge in Beirut.

He was appointed eparch of the Maronite Catholic Eparchy of Baalbek and consecrated bishop on August 15, 1861, by Maronite Patriarch of Antioch Paul Peter Massad. In 1867, he followed Patriarch Massad in his travels to Rome, Paris, and Istanbul. After Massad's death, John Peter El Hajj was unanimously elected patriarch of Antioch of the Maronites on April 28, 1890. El Hajj took the name Boutros Youhanna XII, being enthroned on May 4, 1890. He was confirmed by the Holy See in the consistory of 23 June of the same year.

During his patriarchate, in 1893, he built a new palace around the earlier monastery in the winter residence of the Patriarch at Bkerké. Also, El Hajj instructed the archbishop of Arca di Fenicia dei Maroniti and the future Patriarch Elias Peter Hoayek to raise the necessary funds for the construction of a residence to Maronites in Jerusalem and for the construction of the new Maronite seminary in Rome, which will be inaugurated in 1893. He also supported without any hesitation the work of Latin missionaries. He died on December 24, 1898, in Bkerké.

== See also ==
- List of Maronite Patriarchs
- Maronite Church
- Yusuf al-Asir

== Sources ==
- J. Hajjar, "El-Hage Youhanna," in Dictionnaire d'histoire et de géographie ecclésiastiques, 23 (1990), pp. 25–27.
