= Elias Peter Hoayek =

Head of the Maronite Church from 1898 to 1931

Blessed Elias Peter Hoayek
- Patriarch of Antioch
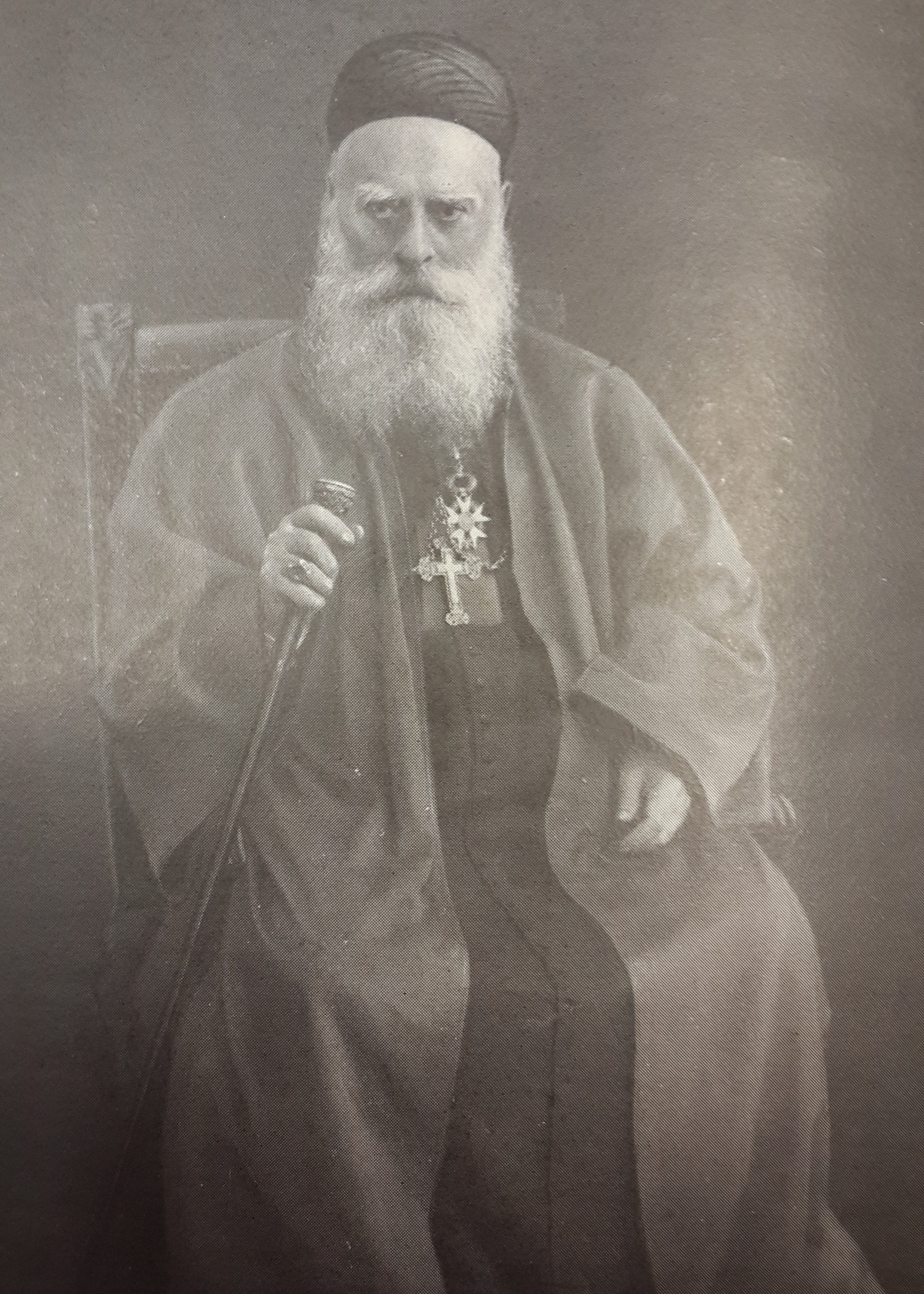
- Church: Maronite Church
- See: Patriarch of Antioch
- Elected: January 6, 1899
- Term ended: December 24, 1931
- Predecessor: John Peter El Hajj
- Successor: Anthony Peter Arida

Orders
- Ordination: 1870 (Priest)
- Consecration: December 14, 1889 (Bishop) by Paul Peter Massad

Personal details
- Born: December 4, 1843 Helta, Tripoli Eyalet, Ottoman Empire
- Died: December 24, 1931 (aged 88) Bkerké, Lebanon

Sainthood
- Venerated in: Roman Catholic Church; Maronite Church; Melkite Greek Catholic Church; Syriac Catholic Church
- Beatified: July 25, 2026

Elias Peter Hoayek (Arabic: الياس بطرس الحويّك; 4 December 1843 – 24 December 1931) was the 72nd Maronite Catholic Patriarch of Antioch from 1898 until his death in 1931. He was also one of the most influential Lebanese political leaders especially from 1918 to 1920.

== Early life ==
Elias Hoayek was born in Helta, Batroun, North Lebanon on December 4, 1843 to a Maronite family with origins in the village of Hsarat, Byblos. His younger brother, Saadallah Howayek, was a politician, and would represent Batroun in the Mutassarifiate's administrative council before going to exile in 1920. He studied at the Seminary College of St. John Maroun in North Lebanon. He later went to the Jesuit seminary of Ghazir in 1859, where he studied languages (French, Arabic, Syriac, Latin, Greek) as well as philosophy. In 1866, he went to Rome to study theology at the Propaganda Fide. In 1870, he was made a Catholic priest and returned to Lebanon. Upon his return, he taught theology at his old school the Seminary of St. John Maroun. He was appointed secretary and moved to the patriarchal residence in 1872, where he remained until 1898 when he was elected Patriarch. He was consecrated titular bishop of Arca on December 14, 1889 by Patriarch Paul Peter Massad.

As vicar of Patriarch John Peter El Hajj, he was commissioned to raise the necessary funds for the construction of a residence to the Maronites in Jerusalem and for the construction of the new Maronite seminary in Rome, which opened in 1893. In 1895, Hoayek founded the Congregation of the Maronite Sisters of the Holy Family.

== Becoming Patriarch ==
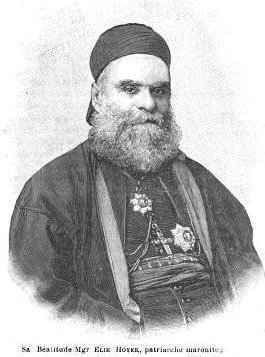
Patriarch Hoayek in 1899

The previous patriarch, John el Hajj, died on Christmas Eve in 1898; Hoayek was requested to return to Lebanon from a trip to Rome. On January 6, 1899, he was elected Patriarch and, in the consistory of June 19, 1899, Hoayek was ratified as the choice of Maronite bishops by Pope Leo XIII, who granted him the pallium.

Hoayek adopted the middle name Peter (Boutros) to signify his being the successor to Peter, first Bishop of Antioch.

Patriarch Hoayek's residence was simple, consisting of three rooms: a bedroom/office, a reception room and a chapel. He was known to particularly revere the readings of the confessions of Augustine of Hippo, the Eternal Maxims and the Imitation of Christ.

Among his first acts as patriarch was the construction of a new residence in Bkerké, replacing the former one; the foundation stone was laid on September 29, 1899. In 1893, he began the construction of the new Maronite College of Rome, inaugurated on February 7, 1904. In 1906, he obtained from the Holy See the division of the eparchy of Tyre and Sidon into two separate dioceses. Between 1906 and 1908, to commemorate the fiftieth anniversary of the proclamation of the dogma of the Immaculate Conception of Mary, he ordered the construction of the statue of the Madonna in Harissa that still dominates the region.

== Support for the diaspora ==
He was behind the creation of a Patriarchal Vicariate in Cairo, Egypt in 1904, the first Maronite ecclesiastical structure after 1736. He was the founder of the church in Cyprus, delegating Shikrallah Khoury and Peter Chebly. He was the founder of the independent dioceses in the United States of America and in Argentina in 1920.

== World War I ==
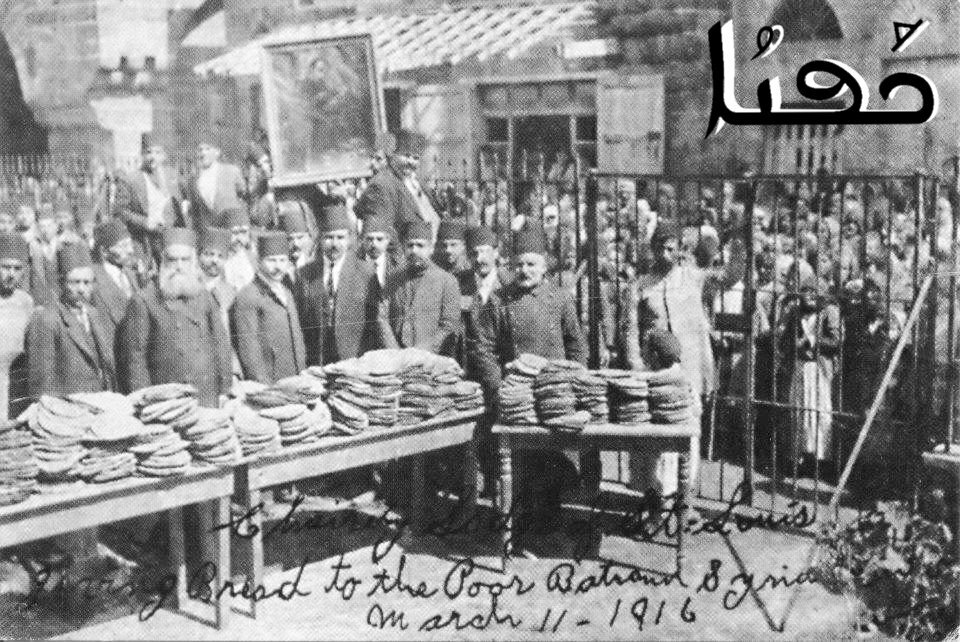
Patriarch Hoayek distributing bread to the hungry during the Kafno

The First World War saw a lot of persecution of the Christians in the Middle East. Some sources cite one and a half million of Armenians were killed by Ottoman forces in the war. The Ottoman Empire was allied to Germany. The Allies (France and Great Britain) set up a blockage of the Lebanese and Syrian coastline against the Ottoman Empire which leads to the start of a famine. Jamal Pasha, Ottoman military governor took steps to exile Hoayek because of his relations with France. In 1915, the blockade as well as a large locust infestation had resulted in diminished food supplies. While the granaries are almost empty, the Ottoman Empire requisitions Lebanese foodstuffs. As a result, a third of the Lebanese population died of starvation. This situation continued until 1919. The Patriarch received funds from Lebanese Diaspora and the French government. Again, Jamal Pasha attempted to exile the Patriarch.

The HM British army entered Damascus while the Ottoman (and their German allies) retreated to the north. This ended four hundred years of Ottoman rule in Lebanon. A transitional governance body was installed by the allied British and French forces.

== Peace Congress in Versailles ==
In 1919, Patriarch Hoayek headed a second Lebanese delegation at the Paris Peace Conference. Prince Faisal had hoped for an Arab kingdom to encompass Lebanon, Syria, Iraq, Palestine, and the Arabian Peninsula. Hoayek fought to be able to see Lebanon free from the Ottoman Empire and had no desire to see it become part of an Arab monarchy.

The Lebanese delegation led by Hoayek presented the Lebanese aspirations as follows:

- The extension of Lebanon to include the cities of Beirut, Tyre, Sidon, Tripoli, Baalbek and the areas of Akkar, Beqaa, Southern Lebanon, the Syrian Coast, Upper Galilee, and the Anti-Lebanon Mountains which were a part of the Mount Lebanon Emirate when it was ruled by Fakhreddine.
- These Muslim-majority cities and areas were natural parts of Lebanon but were administratively separated by the Ottoman rule.
- The recognition of Lebanon's full independence.
- French protectorate over Lebanon.

On October 25, he presented the assembly of the Peace Congress with this memorandum.

== Establishment of French Lebanon ==
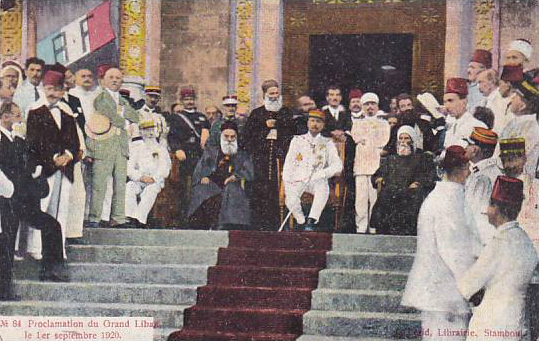
Proclamation of the state of Greater Lebanon

General Gouraud announced a declaration by France of the establishment of "The State of Greater Lebanon" on September 1, 1920. He outlined the country's boundaries to include the area from Ras-al-Naqurah (Naqurah peninsula) in the south to Nahr-el-Kabir in the north and from the summits of the Anti-Lebanon mountain in the east to the Mediterranean sea in the west. The new entity under French mandate was initially called The State of Greater Lebanon.

== Death ==
Patriarch Elias Hoayek died on December 24, 1931, in Bkerké.

== Sainthood ==
Pope Francis authorized the promulgation of decrees on the heroic virtues of Patriarch Elias Howayek, declaring him Venerable on July 5, 2019.

On May 22, 2026, Pope Leo XIV authorized the promulgation of the decree recognizing the miracle attributed to the intercession of the Venerable Servant of God Elias Hoayek, thus paving the way for his beatification.

== Quotation ==
Hoayek wrote: "Both national feeling and religion make it an obligation for you to respect and love everybody whatever may be his belief. Reason leads you to fraternize with the person you live with under the same sky and on the same land." (Hoayek, Al-Zakhair Al-Saniyyat, Jounieh, 1931 p. 501)

== See also ==
- List of Maronite Patriarchs
- Maronite Church

== Sources ==
- Biography of the patriarch Elias Hoayek by HARFOÛCHE, P. Ibrâhîm, Dalâ' it Al 'inâya el-Samdanyat, Lebanese Jounieh, Printing works Missionaries Maronites; 1934.
- Inventing Lebanon: Nationalism and the State Under the Mandate - by Kais M. Firro.
- The Maronite Patriarch Elias Butrus al-Howayyek and the Establishment of Greater Lebanon - by Samawil Bulus, Haifa University, 1987.
- Pierre Dib, v. Maronite (Eglise), in Dictionnaire de Théologie Catholique, Tome Dixième, première partie, Paris 1928, coll. 110–112.
- Zoghbi, Marie-Roger (1991). Une gloire du Liban: Le patriarche Elias Hoyek. Araya, Líbano: Imprimerie catholique.
