= Hsarat =

Hsarat حصارات
- Location within Lebanon
- Coordinates: 34°10′N 35°41′E
- Country: Lebanon
- Governorate: Keserwan-Jbeil
- District: Byblos
- Highest elevation: 641 m (2,103 ft)
- Lowest elevation: 534 m (1,752 ft)
- Time zone: UTC+2 (EET)
  - Summer (DST): UTC+3 (EEST)
- Dialing code: +961 09735...

Hsarat (Arabic: حصارات, romanized: Ḥṣārāt) (also spelled Hisarat, Hasrat, Hsarate, Ḩaşrāt, Hsârâte, Hsarale or Ḩişārāt) is a village in the Byblos District of the Keserwan-Jbeil Governorate, Lebanon. Its inhabitants are predominantly Maronite Catholics. Between the 1850s and 1920s, nearly a 1000 people left Hsarat in boats and ships and emigrated to Italy, France, the United States, Mexico, Brazil, Argentina, Chile and Venezuela. The settlement had 989 registered voters as of 2017.

== Etymology ==
The name Hsarat comes from the Phoenician word haser (𐤇𐤑𐤓) which means "the settled village" (Arabic: القرية المستعمرة).

== History ==
Hsarat has existed since ancient times; however, it was uninhabited for some time until the year 1111 A.D., when the Mardaite prince Shakiban came to it from Ehden. From this prince, the families of Saadeh, Ibrahim and Assi are said to have descended. The Boulos family arrived later, and the Barbour family branched from them. Furthermore, the Houwayek family, which the Maronite patriarch Elias Houwayek is from, is also from Hsarat. The Yazbeck family, which the Najm family branched from, is also from the village.

In the year 1532, Youssef ibn Shakiban al-Hsarati was appointed governor of Batroun, after the previous ruler, Abd al-Sattar al-Kurdi, was killed after attempting to rebel against Mansur Assaf, the emir of North Lebanon at the time.
