= Saadallah Howayek =

Lebanese politician (born c. 1853)

Saadallah Howayek (Arabic: سعد الله الحويك; born c. 1853) was a politician from the Ottoman period. He lived in Helta, Lebanon and served in the Administration Council for Mount Lebanon between the years 1902 and 1907.

== Election to council ==
Franko Pasha was the governor of Mount Lebanon from 1868 to 1873. Saadallah Howayek was appointed as interim mutasarrif after Franko Pasha's office expired, while the Ottoman porte appointed a new governor. Saadallah Howayek was then elected into the Maronite Batroun seat of the Administration Council. He won his seat during the Muzaffer Pasha's (born Wladyslaw Czajkowski, from Poland, born 1843 and died 1907) rule as Mutasarrif or governor of Mount Lebanon from 1902–1907.

== 1910 demonstrations ==
The councilors who defended this position were Saadallah Howayek (Maronite, Batrun); Khalil Akl (Maronite, Matn); Mahmoud Jumblatt (Druze, Jezzine); Mohammad Sabra (Druze, Matn); Elias Chouairi (Greek Orthodox, Matn); Youssef Baridi (Greek Catholic, Zahleh); and Mohammad Mouhsin (Shiite, Keserwan) The Sunni councilor of Jezzin, the Druze councilor of Chouf (Fouad Abd el Malak), the Maronite councilor of Jezzin, and the deputy chairman (Maronite) Qabalan Abi el Lamaa did not participate in the demonstrations this year.

== Political views ==
Many members of the council were liberal bureaucrats committed to the cause of secular authority in the Lebanon Mountain, but there was an ongoing struggle between the liberals and the clergy for the leadership of the Maronites. Some liberals, such as Saadallah Howayek, favored close cooperation with the Maronite Church who fought against liberal Maronite bishops such as Youssef Dibs, who advocated a change in the Church's attitude toward secular authority.

== Political allies and enemies ==
Kanaan Al Daher was elected three times between the years 1888 and 1902 as representative of North Lebanon on the Administrative Council and saadallah Howayek was one of his major supporters in those elections. Saadallah Howayek won and replaced Kanaan Al Daher in the Council in the year 1903, as Kanaan Al Daher had instead been appointed as Ka'em Makam of Keserwan. Yusuf Pasha, chairman from 1907–1912 of Mount Lebanon, even after conflict with the administration council, was left with no choice but to appoint Saadallah Howayek (the leader of the liberal councilors at that time) as deputy chairman of the Council in his final years.

== Exile ==
Many people believed that Lebanon was the Maronite Church's ideal city. This was mainly due to the communities being separated, its population predominantly Christian, and its dependence on a major power for security. Seven councilors began to promote an alternative view of the city, but were condemned as traitors and exiled in 1920. One of the leaders of this group was Saadallah Howayek, a veteran politician, the Maronite representative of Batrun in the Council, and the patriarch's brother.

== See also ==
The Long Peace, Ottoman Lebanon, 1861–1920, Engin Deniz Akarli, University of California Press, Berkeley · Los Angeles · Oxford

The Political History Of Zawieh, Zghorta
