= Lisan al-Hal =

Weekly newspaper in Lebanon

- Type: Weekly newspaper
- Founder: Khalil Khattar Sarkis
- Publisher: Lebanese National Congress
- Founded: 1877; 149 years ago
- Political alignment: Lebanese nationalism
- Language: Arabic
- Headquarters: Beirut
- Country: Lebanon
- Website: Official website

Lisan al-Hal or Lissan ul-Hal (Arabic: لسان الحال 'Mouthpiece') is a Lebanese Arabic language daily newspaper established by Khalil Sarkis in 1877. It is the oldest Lebanese publication still published in Lebanon.

== History ==
Khalil Khattar Sarkis (also known as Khalil Zayniyya) had established his own printing house called Al-Adabiyya through which he printed his newspaper, Lisan al-Hal, and a magazine entitled Al-Mishkat. Said Aql also took part in the establishment of these papers. Khalil Khattar Sarkis was part of the Reform Society of Beirut and the society of the Lebanese Revival whereas Said Aql was a member of the latter. The former was a secret group promoting the independence of Lebanese as a state. During the Ottoman era, the paper was censored several times.

Lisan al-Hal was published twice per week for a long time until the 1900s. One of the early editors of the paper was Salim Sarkis. Yūsuf al-Asir was also one of the early editors. Khalil Khattar Sarkis continued as editor until his death in 1915. Then his son Ramez Khalil Sarkis took over the task until 1941 when he was elected as a member of Parliament from Beirut and was assigned as minister of education. Khalil Ramez Sarkis was also a literary figure and had a series of literary works published. After Khalil Ramez Sarkis, editing and publishing was taken over by Gebran Hayek.

Jean Obeid began to write for the paper in 1960. Bishop George Khodr wrote for the daily in his column called Hadith al-Ahad (The Sunday Talk) from 11 March 1962 to 25 January 1970. The newspaper stopped publication during the Lebanese Civil War in the 1970s.

The daily was disestablished in 1999. The circulation of the paper just before its closing was 33,000. The name and the licence of the paper was acquired by the Lebanese National Congress that resumed its publication as a weekly newspaper.
